This is a complete list of all 1840 Statutory Instruments published in the United Kingdom in the year 1997.

1-100
 Education (Recognised Bodies) Order 1997 (S.I. 1997/1)
 Bedfordshire and Hertfordshire Ambulance and Paramedic Service National Health Service Trust (Establishment) Amendment Order (S.I. 1997/2)
 A312 Trunk Road (The Parkway, Hounslow) Red Route (Temporary Prohibition of Traffic) Order 1997 (S.I. 1997/4)
 A4 Trunk Road (Great West Road, Hounslow) Red Route (Temporary Prohibition of Traffic) Order 1997 (S.I. 1997/5)
 A4 Trunk Road (Great West Road, Hounslow) Red Route (Temporary Prohibition of Traffic) (No. 2) Order 1997 (S.I. 1997/6)
 Plant Protection Products (Amendment) Regulations 1997 (S.I. 1997/7)
 Channel Tunnel Rail Link (Qualifying Authorities) Order 1997 (S.I. 1997/8)
 Channel Tunnel Rail Link (Nomination) Order 1997 (S.I. 1997/9)
 Town and Country Planning (Fees for Applications and Deemed Applications) (Scotland) Regulations 1997 (S.I. 1997/10)
 Control of Substances Hazardous to Health (Amendment) Regulations 1997 (S.I. 1997/11)
 Sheffield Development Corporation (Transfer of Property, Rights and Liabilities) Order 1997 (S.I. 1997/12)
 Sheffield Development Corporation (Planning Functions) Order 1997 (S.I. 1997/13)
 Rules of Procedure (Air Force) (Amendment No. 2) Rules 1997 (S.I. 1997/14)
 Police and Criminal Evidence Act 1984 (Application to the Armed Forces) Order 1997 (S.I. 1997/15)
 Criminal Justice and Public Order Act 1994 (Application to the Armed Forces) Order 1997 (S.I. 1997/16)
 Police and Criminal Evidence Act 1984 (Codes of Practice) (Armed Forces) Order 1997 (S.I. 1997/17)
 Rules of Procedure (Army) (Amendment No. 2) Rules 1997 (S.I. 1997/18)
 Merchant Shipping (Carriage of Cargoes) Regulations 1997 (S.I. 1997/19)
 A2 Trunk Road (Greenwich) Red Route (Clearway) Traffic Order 1997 (S.I. 1997/21)
 Water Undertakers (Extension of Byelaws) Order 1997 (S.I. 1997/22)
 Trading Schemes Act 1996 (Commencement) Order 1997 (S.I. 1997/29)
 Trading Schemes Regulations 1997 (S.I. 1997/30)
 Trading Schemes (Exclusion) Regulations 1997 (S.I. 1997/31)
 Financial Services Act 1986 (Restriction of Scope of Act and Meaning of Collective Investment Scheme) Order 1997 (S.I. 1997/32)
 Hill Livestock (Compensatory Allowances) (Amendment) Regulations 1997 (S.I. 1997/33)
 Osteopaths Act 1993 (Commencement No. 1 and Transitional Provision) Order 1997 (S.I. 1997/34)
 Magistrates' Courts (Remands in Custody) (Amendment) Order 1997 (S.I. 1997/35)
 Criminal Procedure and Investigations Act 1996 (Appointed Day No. 2) Order 1997 (S.I. 1997/36)
 Town and Country Planning (Fees for Applications and Deemed Applications) (Amendment) Regulations 1997 (S.I. 1997/37)
 Occupational Pension Schemes (Contracting-out) Transitional Regulations 1997 (S.I. 1997/38)
 Railway Heritage Scheme Order 1997 (S.I. 1997/39)
 Bethlem and Maudsley National Health Service Trust (Transfer of Trust Property) Order 1997 (S.I. 1997/40)
 Severn National Health Service Trust (Transfer of Trust Property) Order 1997 (S.I. 1997/41)
 Betting, Gaming and Lotteries Act 1963 (Variation of Fees) Order 1997 (S.I. 1997/42)
 Lotteries (Prizes and Expenses: Variation and Prescription of Percentage Limits) Order 1997 (S.I. 1997/43)
 Local Housing Authorities (Prescribed Principles for Allocation Schemes) (Wales) Regulations 1997 (S.I. 1997/45)
 Energy Conservation Act 1996 (Commencement No. 3 and Adaptations) Order 1997 (S.I. 1997/47)
 Value Added Tax (Registered Social Landlords) (No. 1) Order 1997 (S.I. 1997/50)
 Value Added Tax (Registered Social Landlords) (No. 2) Order 1997 (S.I. 1997/51)
 Greenwich Healthcare National Health Service Trust (Transfer Of Trust Property) Order 1997 (S.I. 1997/52)
 Oxleas Healthcare National Health Service Trust (Transfer Of Trust Property) Order 1997 (S.I. 1997/53)
 Education (Listed Bodies) Order 1997 (S.I. 1997/54)
 Road Traffic (Permitted Parking Area and Special Parking Area) (County of Buckinghamshire) (High Wycombe Town Centre) Order 1997 (S.I. 1997/56)
 Electronic Lodgement of Tax Returns Order 1997 (S.I. 1997/57)
 Motor Vehicles (Designation of Approved Marks) (Amendment) Regulations 1997 (S.I. 1997/58)
 Food Protection (Emergency Prohibitions) (Radioactivity in Sheep) Partial Revocation Order 1997 (S.I. 1997/62)
 Act of Adjournal (Criminal Procedure Rules Amendment) 1997 (S.I. 1997/63)
 Patents (Supplementary Protection Certificates) Rules 1997 (S.I. 1997/64)
 Income-related Benefits and Jobseeker's Allowance (Miscellaneous Amendments) Regulations 1997 (S.I. 1997/65)
 Housing Act 1996 (Commencement No. 6 and Savings) Order 1997 (S.I. 1997/66)
 Secure Tenancies (Notices) (Amendment) Regulations 1997 (S.I. 1997/71)
 Introductory Tenants (Review) Regulations 1997 (S.I. 1997/72)
 Secure Tenants of Local Housing Authorities (Right to Repair) (Amendment) Regulations 1996 S.I. 1997/73)
 Housing Act 1996 (Consequential Amendments) Order 1997 (S.I. 1997/74)
 Local Government Changes for England (Valuation and Community Charge Tribunals) Regulations 1997 (S.I. 1997/75)
 Betting, Gaming and Lotteries Act 1963 (Variation of Fees) (Scotland) Order 1997 (S.I. 1997/77)
 National Health Service Pension Scheme and Provision of Information and Administrative Expenses etc. (Amendment) Regulations 1997 (S.I. 1997/80)
 Motor Vehicles (Tests) (Amendment) Regulations 1997 (S.I. 1997/81)
 Goods Vehicles (Plating and Testing) (Amendment) Regulations 1997 (S.I. 1997/82)
 Road Vehicles (Prohibition) (Amendment) Regulations 1997 (S.I. 1997/83)
 Public Service Vehicles (Conditions of Fitness, Equipment, Use and Certification) (Amendment) Regulations 1997 (S.I. 1997/84)
 A12 Trunk Road (Redbridge) (No. 1) Red Route Traffic Order 1996 Experimental Variation Order 1997 (S.I. 1997/87)
 A312 Trunk Road (Hounslow) Red Route (Clearway) Traffic Order 1997 (S.I. 1997/88)
 Public Telecommunication System Designation (Videotron Southampton & Eastleigh Limited) Order 1997 (S.I. 1997/90)
 Cumbria College of Art and Design Further Education Corporation (Transfer to the Higher Education Sector) Order 1997 (S.I. 1997/91)
 Education (Fees and Awards) (Scotland) Regulations 1997 (S.I. 1997/93)
 A4 Trunk Road (Great West Road, Hounslow) Red Route (Prescribed Routes) Traffic Order 1997 (S.I. 1997/96)
 Motor Vehicles (Third Party Risks) (Amendment) Regulations 1997 (S.I. 1997/97)

101-200
 Local Authorities (Goods and Services) (Public Bodies) Order 1997 (S.I. 1997/101)
 Yorkshire Dales Light Railway Order 1997 (S.I. 1997/102)
 Scottish Enterprise (Aggregate Amount Outstanding) Order 1997 (S.I. 1997/119)
 Non-Domestic Rate (Scotland) Order 1997 (S.I. 1997/120)
 A41 Trunk Road (Camden) Red Route (Bus Lanes) Experimental Traffic Order 1997 (S.I. 1997/123)
 Local Government Act 1988 (Security Work) (Exemption) (Wales) Order 1997 (S.I. 1997/124)
 Local Government Act 1988 (Competition) (Information Technology Services) (Wales) Regulations 1997 (S.I. 1997/125)
 Local Government Act 1988 (Competition) (Legal Services) (Wales) Regulations 1997 (S.I. 1997/126)
 Local Government Act 1988 (Competition) (Construction and Property Services) (Wales) Regulations 1997 (S.I. 1997/127)
 Local Government Act 1988 (Competition) (Supervision of Parking, Management of Vehicles and Security Work) (Wales) Regulations 1997 (S.I. 1997/128)
 Local Government Act 1988 (Competition) (Personnel Services) (Wales) Regulations 1997 (S.I. 1997/129)
 Local Government Act 1988 (Competition) (Financial Services) (Wales) Regulations 1997 (S.I. 1997/130)
 Code of Practice on Equal Pay (Appointed Day) Order 1997 (S.I. 1997/131)
 Finance Act 1996, Schedule 35, (Appointed Day) Order 1997 (S.I. 1997/133)
 Employment Act 1989 (Commencement No. 2) Order 1997 (S.I. 1997/134)
 Health and Safety (Young Persons) Regulations 1997 (S.I. 1997/135)
 Children (Scotland) Act 1995 (Commencement No. 2 and Transitional Provisions) (Amendment) Order 1997 (S.I. 1997/137)
 Local Government Reorganisation (Representation of the People) Regulations 1997 (S.I. 1997/138)
 A205 Trunk Road (Greenwich) Red Route Experimental Traffic Order 1997 (S.I. 1997/139)
 A205 Trunk Road (Greenwich) Red Route Experimental (Banned Turns) Traffic Order 1997 (S.I. 1997/140)
 Milford Port Health Authority (Amendment) Order 1997 (S.I. 1997/143)
 Diseases of Poultry (Amendment) Order 1997 (S.I. 1997/150)
 Dockyard Services (Rosyth) (Designation and Appointed Day) (Revocation) Order 1997 (S.I. 1997/151)
 Dockyard Services (Devonport) (Designation and Appointed Day) (Revocation) Order 1997 (S.I. 1997/152)
 A3 Trunk Road (Malden Way And Tolworth Rise, Kingston upon Thames) (Prescribed Routes) Order 1974 (Variation) Order 1997 (S.I. 1997/153)
 A3 Trunk Road (Roehampton Vale, Wandsworth) (Prescribed Routes) Order 1988 (Variation) Order 1997 (S.I. 1997/154)
 A12 Trunk Road (Colchester Road, Havering) (Prescribed Routes) Order 1997 (S.I. 1997/155)
 City of Gloucester (Electoral Changes) Order 1997 (S.I. 1997/157)
 International Carriage of Dangerous Goods by Road (Fees) (Amendment) Regulations 1997 (S.I. 1997/158)
 Local Government Changes for England (Transport Levying Bodies) Regulations 1997 (S.I. 1997/165)
 Organic Products (Amendment) Regulations 1997 (S.I. 1997/166)
 Broadcasting (Sign Language) Order 1997 (S.I. 1997/167)
 International Organisations (Miscellaneous Exemptions) Order 1997 (S.I. 1997/168)
 Courts Martial (Army) Rules 1997 (S.I. 1997/169)
 Courts Martial (Royal Navy) Rules 1997 (S.I. 1997/170)
 Courts Martial (Royal Air Force) Rules 1997 (S.I. 1997/171)
 Standing Civilian Courts Order 1997 (S.I. 1997/172)
 Criminal Justice Act 1967 (Application to Courts-Martial) (Evidence) Regulations 1997 (S.I. 1997/173)
 Scottish Dental Practice Board Regulations 1997 (S.I. 1997/174)
 Local Government Act 1988 (Competition) (England) Regulations 1997 (S.I. 1997/175)
 Local Government Act 1988 (Defined Activities) (Housing Management and Security Work) (Exemptions) (England) Order 1997 (S.I. 1997/176)
 Court Funds (Amendment) Rules 1997 (S.I. 1997/177)
 Land Registration Fees Order 1997 (S.I. 1997/178)
 Forest of Dean (Parishes and Electoral Changes) Order 1997 (S.I. 1997/179)
 Control of Pesticides (Amendment) Regulations 1997 (S.I. 1997/188)
 Plant Protection Products (Basic Conditions) Regulations 1997 (S.I. 1997/189)
 Leeds Teaching Hospitals Special Trustees (Transfer of Trust Property) Order 1997 (S.I. 1997/190)
 Motor Vehicles (EC Type Approval) (Amendment) Regulations 1997 (S.I. 1997/191)
 Assured Tenancies and Agricultural Occupancies (Forms) Regulations 1997 (S.I. 1997/194)
 Beef (Marketing Payment) (No. 2) (Amendment) Regulations 1997 (S.I. 1997/195)
 Wolverhampton Health Care National Health Service Trust (Transfer of Trust Property) Order 1997 (S.I. 1997/196)
 Local Government Act 1988 (Competition) (Scotland) Regulations 1997 (S.I. 1997/197)
 Local Government Act 1988 (Defined Activities) (Exemptions) (Scotland) Order 1997 (S.I. 1997/198)
 Housing Revenue Account General Fund Contribution Limits (Scotland) Order 1997 (S.I. 1997/199)
 A205 Trunk Road (Upper Richmond Road West) Red Route (Prescribed Route) Traffic Order 1997 (S.I. 1997/200)

201-300
 A1 Trunk Road (Haringey) Red Route Traffic Order 1993 Variation Order 1997 (S.I. 1997/201)
 A1 Trunk Road (Islington) Red Route Traffic Order 1993 Variation No. 3 Order 1997 (S.I. 1997/202)
 City of Westminster (A41 Trunk Road) Red Route (Bus Lanes) Experimental Traffic Order 1997 (S.I. 1997/203)
 Local Authorities (Goods and Services) (Public Bodies) (Trunk Roads) (No. 1) Order 1997 (S.I. 1997/204)
 Act of Sedurant (Judicial Factors Rules) (Amendment) 1997 (S.I. 1997/206)
 General Teaching Council for Scotland (Amendment of Constitution) Order 1997 (S.I. 1997/207)
 A41 Trunk Road (Camden) Red Route Experimental (No. 2) Traffic Order 1997 (S.I. 1997/208)
 Western Isles Council (Brevig) Harbour Revision Order 1997 (S.I. 1997/209)
 Consumer Credit (Quotations) (Revocation) Regulations 1997 (S.I. 1997/211)
 Authorised Unit Trusts (Interest Distributions) (Qualifying Investments) Order 1997 (S.I. 1997/212)
 Unit Trust Schemes and Offshore Funds (Non-qualifying Investments Test) Order 1997 (S.I. 1997/213)
 Income Tax (Employments) (Amendment) Regulations 1997 (S.I. 1997/214)
 Local Government Changes for England (Council Tax) (Transitional Reduction) Regulations 1997 (S.I. 1997/215)
 Pensions Act 1995 (Commencement No. 9) Order1997 (S.I. 1997/216)
 Water Supply Byelaws (Scotland) Extension of Period Order 1997 (S.I. 1997/217)
 Local Government Pension Scheme (London Boroughs Children's Regional Planning Committee) Regulations 1997 (S.I. 1997/218)
 Passenger and Goods Vehicles (Recording Equipment) (Approval of Fitters and Workshops) (Fees) (Amendment) Regulations 1997 (S.I. 1997/219)
 Companies Act 1985 (Accounts of Small and Medium-sized Companies and Minor Accounting Amendments) Regulations 1997 (S.I. 1997/220)
 Common Lodging Houses (Repeal) Consequential Provisions Order 1997 (S.I. 1997/221)
 Gas Act 1995 (Rateable Values) (Modification) Order 1997 (S.I. 1997/224)
 Housing Act 1996 (Commencement No. 7 and Savings) Order 1997 (S.I. 1997/225)
 Wildlife and Countryside Act 1981 (Variation of Schedule 9) Order 1997 (S.I. 1997/226)
 Housing (Enforcement Procedures for Houses in Multiple Occupation) Order 1997 (S.I. 1997/227)
 Housing (Recovery of Expenses for Section 352 Notices) Order 1997 (S.I. 1997/228)
 Housing in Multiple Occupation (Fees for Registration Schemes) Order 1997 (S.I. 1997/229)
 Housing (Fire Safety in Houses in Multiple Occupation) Order 1997 (S.I. 1997/230)
 Royal Air Force Terms of Service (Amendment) Regulations 1997 (S.I. 1997/231)
 Local Authorities (Alteration of Requisite Calculations) Regulations 1997 (S.I. 1997/232)
 County Council of the Royal County of Berkshire (River Kennet, Fobney Bridge Reading) Scheme 1996 Confirmation Instrument 1997 (S.I. 1997/233)
 Public Telecommunication System Designation (Telewest Communications (Southport) Limited) Order 1997 (S.I. 1997/234)
 Public Telecommunication System Designation (Lichfield Cable Communications Limited) Order 1997 (S.I. 1997/235)
 Superannuation (Admission to Schedule 1 to the Superannuation Act 1972) Order 1997 (S.I. 1997/236)
 Food Protection (Emergency Prohibitions) (Oil and Chemical Pollution of Fish and Plants) (Partial Revocation) Order 1997 (S.I. 1997/239)
 Electricity (Non-Fossil Fuel Sources) (England and Wales) Order 1997 (S.I. 1997/248)
 Suckler Cow Premium (Amendment) Regulations 1997 (S.I. 1997/249)
 Dairy Produce Quotas (Amendment) Regulations 1997 (S.I. 1997/250)
 Special Waste (Amendment) Regulations 1997 (S.I. 1997/251)
 Occupational Pension Schemes (Independent Trustee) Regulations 1997 (S.I. 1997/252)
 Passenger Transport Executives (Capital Finance) (Amendment) Order 1997 (S.I. 1997/253)
 Superannuation (Admission to Schedule 1 to the Superannuation Act 1972) (No. 2) Order 1997 (S.I. 1997/254)
 Value Added Tax Tribunals (Amendment) Rules 1997 (S.I. 1997/255)
 Motor Vehicles (Driving Licences) (Amendment) Regulations 1997 (S.I. 1997/256)
 Special Waste (Scotland) Regulations 1997 (S.I. 1997/257)
 A205 Trunk Road (Lewisham) Red Route Experimental Traffic Order 1997 (S.I. 1997/258)
 Local Government Reorganisation (Wales) (Council Tax Reduction Scheme) Regulations 1997 (S.I. 1997/261)
 Residuary Body for Wales (9 Swansea Road Llanelli) Order 1997 (S.I. 1997/262)
 Goods Vehicles (Plating and Testing) (Amendment) (No. 2) Regulations 1997 (S.I. 1997/263)
 London Underground (East London Line Extension) Order 1997 (S.I. 1997/264)
 Life Assurance and Other Policies (Keeping of Information and Duties of Insurers) Regulations 1997 (S.I. 1997/265)
 Potato Industry Development Council Order 1997 (S.I. 1997/266)
 Road Traffic (New Drivers) Act 1995 (Commencement) Order 1997 (S.I. 1997/267)
 Continental Shelf (Designation of Areas) Order 1997 (S.I. 1997/268)
 European Communities (Definition of Treaties) (Europe Agreement establishing an Association between the European Communities and their Member States and the Republic of Estonia) Order 1997 (S.I. 1997/269)
 European Communities (Definition of Treaties) (Europe Agreement establishing an Association between the European Communities and their Member States and the Republic of Latvia) Order 1997 (S.I. 1997/270)
 European Communities (Definition of Treaties) (Europe Agreement establishing an Association between the European Communities and their Member States and the Republic of Lithuania) Order 1997 (S.I. 1997/271)
 United Nations Arms Embargoes (Dependent Territories) (Amendment) Order 1997 (S.I. 1997/272)
 United Nations Arms Embargoes (Rwanda) (Amendment) Order 1997 (S.I. 1997/273)
 Construction Contracts (Northern Ireland) Order 1997 (S.I. 1997/274)
 Immigration (Isle of Man) Order 1997 (S.I. 1997/275)
 Road Traffic Regulation (Northern Ireland) Order 1997 (S.I. 1997/276)
 Theft (Amendment) (Northern Ireland) Order 1997 (S.I. 1997/277)
 Territorial Sea Act 1987 (Jersey) Order 1997 (S.I. 1997/278)
 United Nations Arms Embargoes (Somalia, Liberia and Rwanda) (Channel Islands) (Amendment) Order 1997 (S.I. 1997/279)
 United Nations Arms Embargoes (Somalia, Liberia and Rwanda) (Isle of Man) (Amendment) Order 1997 (S.I. 1997/280)
 United Nations (International Tribunals) (Former Yugoslavia and Rwanda) (Guernsey) Order 1997 (S.I. 1997/281)
 United Nations (International Tribunals) (Former Yugoslavia and Rwanda) (Isle of Man) Order 1997 (S.I. 1997/282)
 United Nations (International Tribunals) (Former Yugoslavia and Rwanda) (Jersey) Order 1997 (S.I. 1997/283)
 Wireless Telegraphy (Channel Islands) (Amendment) Order 1997 (S.I. 1997/284)
 Wireless Telegraphy (Isle of Man) (Amendment) Order 1997 (S.I. 1997/285)
 Naval, Military and Air Forces Etc. (Disablement and Death) Service Pensions Amendment Order 1997 (S.I. 1997/286)
 Air Navigation (Second Amendment) Order 1997 (S.I. 1997/287)
 Education (Chief Inspector of Schools in Wales) Order 1997 (S.I. 1997/288)
 Wireless Telegraphy (Television Licence Fees) Regulations 1997 (S.I. 1997/290)
 Act of Sederunt (Child Care and Maintenance Rules) 1997 (S.I. 1997/291)
 Sheffield Development Corporation (Area and Constitution) Order 1997 (S.I. 1997/292)
 Education (Transfer of Functions Relating to Grant-maintained Schools) Order 1997 (S.I. 1997/294)

301-400
 Civil Jurisdiction and Judgements Act 1982 (Interim Relief) Order 1997 (S.I. 1997/302)
 Armed Forces Act 1996 (Commencement No. 2) Order 1997 (S.I. 1997/304)
 Reserve Forces Act 1996 (Commencement No. 1) Order 1997 (S.I. 1997/305)
 Reserve Forces Act 1996 (Transitional, Consequential and Saving Provisions) Regulations 1997 (S.I. 1997/306)
 Reserve Forces (Call-out and Recall) (Exemptions Etc.) Regulations 1997 (S.I. 1997/307)
 Reserve Forces (Provision of Information by Persons Liable to be Recalled) Regulations 1997 (S.I. 1997/308)
 Reserve Forces (Call-out and Recall) (Financial Assistance) Regulations 1997 (S.I. 1997/309)
 Importation of Bees Order 1997 (S.I. 1997/310)
 Teachers (Compensation for Redundancy and Premature Retirement) Regulations 1997 (S.I. 1997/311)
 Teachers' Superannuation (Amendment) Regulations 1997 (S.I. 1997/312)
 Public Telecommunication System Designation (Birmingham Cable Limited) Order 1997 (S.I. 1997/313)
 Public Telecommunications System Designation (HSCo Limited) Order 1997 (S.I. 1997/314)
 Public Telecommunication System Designation (Telewest Communications Fylde and Wyre Limited) Order 1997 (S.I. 1997/315)
 Independent Qualified Conveyancers (Scotland) Regulations 1997 (S.I. 1997/316)
 Executry Practitioners (Scotland) Regulations 1997 (S.I. 1997/317)
 Local Government (Consequential Provisions) (Scotland) Order 1997 (S.I. 1997/318)
 Local Authorities (Capital Finance) Regulations 1997 (S.I. 1997/319)
 Hovercraft (Fees) Regulations 1997 (S.I. 1997/320)
 Registration of Homeopathic Veterinary Medicinal Products (Fees) Regulations 1997 (S.I. 1997/321)
 Registration of Homoeopathic Veterinary Medicinal Products Regulations 1997 (S.I. 1997/322)
 Export of Goods (Control) (Amendment) Order 1997 (S.I. 1997/323)
 Dual-Use and Related Goods (Export Control) (Amendment) Regulations 1997 (S.I. 1997/324)
 Llanelli Harbour Revision Order 1997 (S.I. 1997/325)
 Health Promotion Authority for Wales Constitution (Amendment) Order 1997 (S.I. 1997/326)
 Health Promotion Authority for Wales Regulations 1997 (S.I. 1997/327)
 Housing (Change of Landlord) (Payment of Disposal Cost by Instalments) (Amendment) Regulations 1997 (S.I. 1997/328)
 Local Government Pension Scheme (Internal Dispute Resolution Procedure) Regulations 1997 (S.I. 1997/329)
 Countryside Premium Scheme (Scotland) Regulations 1997 (S.I. 1997/330)
 New Town (Cumbernauld) (Transfer of Property, Rights and Liabilities) Order 1997 (S.I. 1997/341)
 New Town (Livingston) (Transfer of Property, Rights and Liabilities) Order 1997 (S.I. 1997/342)
 New Town (Irvine) (Transfer of Property, Rights and Liabilities) Order 1997 (S.I. 1997/343)
 Merchant Shipping (Disqualification of Holder of Seaman's Certificates) Regulations 1997 (S.I. 1997/346)
 Merchant Shipping (Section 63 Inquiries) Rules 1997 (S.I. 1997/347)
 Merchant Shipping (Training and Certification) Regulation 1997 (S.I. 1997/348 (See also S.I. 1997/1911))
 Social Security (Disability Living Allowance) Amendment Regulations 1997 (S.I. 1997/349)
 Housing Act 1996 (Commencement No. 8) Order 1997 (S.I. 1997/350)
 Waste Management (Miscellaneous Provisions) Regulations 1997 (S.I. 1997/351)
 A205 Trunk Road (Westhorne Avenue, Greenwich) (Temporary Prohibition of Traffic) Order 1997 (S.I. 1997/353)
 University Hospital Birmingham National Health Service Trust (Transfer of Trust Property) Order 1997 (S.I. 1997/354)
 Kent and Canterbury Hospitals National Health Service Trust (Transfers of Trust Property) Order 1997 (S.I. 1997/355)
 Non-Domestic Rating (Demand Notices) (Wales) (Amendment) Regulations 1997 (S.I. 1997/356)
 Council Tax (Demand Notices) (Wales) (Transitional Provisions) Regulations 1997 (S.I. 1997/357)
 Occupational and Personal Pension Schemes (Contracting-out etc.: Review of Determinations) Regulations 1997 (S.I. 1997/358)
 Civil Courts (Amendment) Order 1997 (S.I. 1997/361)
 Water Services Charges (Billing and Collection) (Scotland) Order 1997 (S.I. 1997/362)
 Domestic Sewerage Charges (Reduction) (Scotland) Regulations 1997 (S.I. 1997/363)
 Scottish Qualifications Authority (Transfer Date) (Scotland) Order 1997 (S.I. 1997/364)
 Education (Scotland) Act 1996 (Commencement No. 2) Order 1997 (S.I. 1997/365)
 Town and Country Planning (General Permitted Development) (Amendment) Order 1997 (S.I. 1997/366)
 Jobseeker's Allowance (Amendment) Regulations 1997 (S.I. 1997/367)
 Education (Teachers) (Amendment) Regulations 1997 (S.I. 1997/368)
 Income Tax (Charge to Tax) (Payments out of Surplus Funds) (Relevant Rate) Order 1997 (S.I. 1997/369)
 Register of Occupational and Personal Pension Schemes 1997 (S.I. 1997/371)
 Secure Tenancies (Notices) (Amendment No. 2) Regulations 1997 (S.I. 1997/377)
 Act of Sedurant (Lands Valuation Appeal Court) 1997 (S.I. 1997/378)
 Act of Sedurant (Registration Appeal Court) 1997 (S.I. 1997/379)
 Local Authorities (Capital Finance) (Rate of Discount for 1997/98) Regulations 1997 (S.I. 1997/381)
 Plant Breeders' Rights (Fees) (Amendment) Regulations 1997 (S.I. 1997/382)
 Seeds (National Lists of Varieties) (Fees) (Amendment) Regulations 1997 (S.I. 1997/383)
 Road Traffic Offenders (Additional Offences and Prescribed Devices) Order 1997 (S.I. 1997/384)
 Bovine Products (Production and Despatch) Regulations 1997 (S.I. 1997/389)
 Education (Grants for Education Support and Training) (Wales) Regulations 1997 (S.I. 1997/390)
 Self-Governing Schools etc. (Scotland) Act 1989 (Commencement No. 3) Order 1997 (S.I. 1997/391)
 Council Tax (Administration and Enforcement) (Amendment) Regulations 1997 (S.I. 1997/393)
 Council Tax and Non-Domestic Rating (Demand Notices) (England) (Amendment) Regulations 1997 (S.I. 1997/394)
 North and Mid Hampshire Health Authority (Transfers of Trust Property) Order 1997 (S.I. 1997/395)
 Public Record Office (Fees) Regulations 1997 (S.I. 1997/400)

401-500
 Road Vehicles (Registration and Licensing) (Amendment) Regulations 1997 (S.I. 1997/401)
 Criminal Appeal Act 1995 (Commencement No. 4 and Transitional Provisions) Order 1997 (S.I. 1997/402)
 Economic Regulation of Airports (Expenses of the Monopolies and Mergers Commission) Regulations 1997 (S.I. 1997/403)
 Black Country Mental Health National Health Service Trust (Transfer of Trust Property) Order 1997 (S.I. 1997/404)
 Lloyd's Underwriters (Double Taxation Relief) Regulations 1997 (S.I. 1997/405)
 Local Government Act 1988 (Defined Activities (Exemption) (Tonbridge and Malling Borough Council) Order 1997 (S.I. 1997/406)
 Industrial Training Levy (Construction Board) Order 1997 (S.I. 1997/407)
 Industrial Training Levy (Engineering Construction Board) Order 1997 (S.I. 1997/408)
 Public Telecommunication System Designation (Telewest Communications plc) Order 1997 (S.I. 1997/409)
 Rules of the Supreme Court (Amendment) 1997 (S.I. 1997/415)
 Civil Legal Aid (General) (Amendment) Regulations 1997 (S.I. 1997/416)
 Weald of Kent Community National Health Service Trust Dissolution Order 1997 (S.I. 1997/417)
 Maidstone Priority Care National Health Service Trust Dissolution Order 1997 (S.I. 1997/418)
 Invicta Community Care National Health Service Trust (Establishment) Order 1997 (S.I. 1997/419)
 Town and Country Planning (Determination of Appeals by Appointed Persons) (Prescribed Classes) Regulations 1997 (S.I. 1997/420)
 South East Water Limited (Extension of Byelaws) Order 1997 (S.I. 1997/421)
 Education (Mandatory Awards) Regulations 1997 (S.I. 1997/431)
 London Borough of Islington (Trunk Roads) Red Route (Bus Lanes) Traffic Order 1997 (S.I. 1997/445)
 City of Westminster (Trunk Roads) Red Route (Bus Lanes) Traffic Order 1997 (S.I. 1997/446)
 Northampton Community Healthcare National Health Service Trust (Transfer of Trust Property) Order 1997 (S.I. 1997/447)
 Princess Alexandra Hospital National Health Service Trust (Transfer of Trust Property) Order 1997 (S.I. 1997/448)
 London Borough of Haringey (Trunk Roads) Red Route (Bus Lanes) Traffic Order 1997 (S.I. 1997/449)
 London Borough of Enfield (Trunk Roads) Red Route (Bus Lanes) Traffic Order 1997 (S.I. 1997/450)
 Infant Formula and Follow-on Formula (Amendment) Regulations 1997 (S.I. 1997/451)
 Non-Domestic Rates (Levying) (Scotland) Regulations 1997 (S.I. 1997/452)
 Birmingham Heartlands and Solihull (Teaching) National Health Service Trust (Transfer of Trust Property) Order 1997 (S.I. 1997/453)
 Social Security (Miscellaneous Amendments) Regulations 1997 (S.I. 1997/454)
 Local Government Act 1988 (Defined Activities) (Exemption) (Lichfield District Council) Order 1997 (S.I. 1997/455)
 Wiltshire County Council (Borough of Thamesdown) (Staff Transfer) Order 1997 (S.I. 1997/456)
 Guaranteed Minimum Pensions Increase Order 1997 (S.I. 1997/457)
 Dorset County Council (Boroughs of Poole and Bournemouth) (Staff Transfer) Order 1997 (S.I. 1997/458)
 Derbyshire County Council (City of Derby) (Staff Transfer) Order 1997 (S.I. 1997/459)
 Durham County Council (Borough of Darlington) (Staff Transfer) Order 1997 (S.I. 1997/460)
 East Sussex County Council (Boroughs of Brighton and Hove) (Staff Transfer) Order 1997 (S.I. 1997/461)
 London Borough of Camden (Trunk Roads) Red Route (Bus Lanes) Traffic Order 1997 (S.I. 1997/463)
 A10 Trunk Road (Haringey) Red Route Traffic Order 1997 (S.I. 1997/464)
 A13 Trunk Road (Newham) Red Route Traffic Order 1997 (S.I. 1997/465)
 A13 Trunk Road (Tower Hamlets) Red Route Traffic Order 1997 (S.I. 1997/466)
 A41 Trunk Road (Barnet) Red Route Traffic Order 1997 (S.I. 1997/467)
 Hampshire County Council (Cities of Portsmouth and Southampton) (Staff Transfer) Order 1997 (S.I. 1997/468)
 Staffordshire County Council (City of Stoke-on-Trent) (Staff Transfer) Order 1997 (S.I. 1997/469)
 Personal Pension Schemes (Appropriate Schemes) Regulations 1997 (S.I. 1997/470)
 Friendly Societies (Modification of the Corporation Tax Acts) (Amendment) Regulations 1997 (S.I. 1997/471)
 Friendly Societies (Taxation of Transfers of Business) (Amendment) Regulations 1997 (S.I. 1997/472)
 Friendly Societies (Modification of the Corporation Tax Acts) Regulations 1997 (S.I. 1997/473)
 Friendly Societies (Provisional Repayments for Exempt Business) (Amendment) Regulations 1997 (S.I. 1997/474)
 Friendly Societies (Gilt-edged Securities) (Periodic Accounting for Tax on Interest) (Amendment) Regulations 1997 (S.I. 1997/475)
 Leicestershire County Council (City of Leicester and District of Rutland) (Staff Transfer) Order 1997 (S.I. 1997/476)
 Injuries in War (Shore Employments) Compensation (Amendment) Scheme 1997 (S.I. 1997/477)
 Bedfordshire County Council (Borough of Luton) (Staff Transfer) Order 1997 (S.I. 1997/478)
 Buckinghamshire County Council (Borough of Milton Keynes) (Staff Transfer) Order 1997 (S.I. 1997/479)
 Personal Pension Schemes (Transfer Payments) (Amendment) Regulations 1997 (S.I. 1997/480)
 Insurance Companies (Overseas Life Assurance Business) (Compliance) (Amendment) Regulations 1997 (S.I. 1997/481)
 Charities (Iveagh Bequest, Kenwood) Order 1997 (S.I. 1997/482)
 Allocation of Housing (Procedure) Regulations 1997 (S.I. 1997/483)
 Sugar Beet (Research and Education) Order 1997 (S.I. 1997/484)
 National Assistance (Assessment of Resources) (Amendment) Regulations 1997 (S.I. 1997/485)
 National Assistance (Sums for Personal Requirements) Regulations 1997 (S.I. 1997/486)
 Level Crossings Regulations 1997 (S.I. 1997/487)
 East Sussex (Coroners) Order 1997 (S.I. 1997/488)
 Hampshire (Coroners) Order 1997 (S.I. 1997/489)
 Leicestershire (Coroners) Order 1997 (S.I. 1997/490)
 BBC Home Service Transfer Scheme (Capital Allowances) Order 1997 (S.I. 1997/491)
 Staffordshire (Coroners) Order 1997 (S.I. 1997/492)
 Wiltshire (Coroners) Order 1997 (S.I. 1997/493)
 Bedfordshire (Coroners) Order 1997 (S.I. 1997/494)
 Buckinghamshire (Coroners) Order 1997 (S.I. 1997/495)
 Derbyshire (Coroners) Order 1997 (S.I. 1997/496)
 Dorset (Coroners) Order 1997 (S.I. 1997/497)
 Durham (Coroners) Order 1997 (S.I. 1997/498)

501-600
 Professions Supplementary to Medicine (Prosthetists and Orthotists Board) Order of Council 1997 (S.I. 1997/504)
 Merchant Shipping (Prevention of Pollution) (Limits) Regulations 1997 (S.I. 1997/506)
 Value Added Tax (Finance) Order 1997 (S.I. 1997/510)
 Personal Equity Plan (Amendment) Regulations 1997 (S.I. 1997/511)
 Registration of Births, Still-births, Deaths and Marriages (Prescription of Forms) (Scotland) Amendment Regulations 1997 (S.I. 1997/512)
 South Park Sixth Form College, Middlesbrough (Dissolution) Order 1997 (S.I. 1997/513)
 Education (Grants for Education Support and Training) (England) Regulations 1997 (S.I. 1997/514)
 Education (Funding for Teacher Training) Designation Order 1997 (S.I. 1997/515)
 National Health Service (Existing Liabilities Scheme) (Amendment) Regulations 1997 (S.I. 1997/526)
 National Health Service (Clinical Negligence Scheme) (Amendment) Regulations 1997 (S.I. 1997/527)
 Local Government Act 1988 (Direct Service Organisations) (Accounts etc.) (Extension) (Wales) Order 1997 (S.I. 1997/528)
 Merchant Shipping (Minimum Standards of Safety Communications) Regulations 1997 (S.I. 1997/529)
 Road Vehicles (Construction and Use) (Amendment) Regulations 1997 (S.I. 1997/530)
 Town and Country Planning (Development Plan) (Amendment) Regulations 1997 (S.I. 1997/531)
 Local Government Act 1988 (Defined Activities) (Exemptions) (London Boroughs of Newham and Southwark) Order 1997 (S.I. 1997/532)
 Local Government Act 1988 (Defined Activities) (Exemptions) (London Borough of Brent) Order 1997 (S.I. 1997/533)
 Customs Reviews and Appeals (Tariff and Origin) Regulations 1997 (S.I. 1997/534)
 Section 19 Minibus (Designated Bodies) (Amendment) Order 1997 (S.I. 1997/535)
 Disability Discrimination (Abolition of District Advisory Committees) Order 1997 (S.I. 1997/536)
 Returning Officers (Parliamentary Constituencies) (England) (Amendment) Order 1997 (S.I. 1997/537)
 Residuary Body for Wales (Dyffryn House and Gardens) Order 1997 (S.I. 1997/540)
 Lancashire County Council (Westgate Link Road, Burnley) (The New Barracks Canal Bridge) Scheme 1996 Confirmation Instrument 1997 (S.I. 1997/541)
 Common Agricultural Policy (Wine) (Amendment) Regulations 1997 (S.I. 1997/542)
 Social Security Benefits Up-rating Order 1997 (S.I. 1997/543)
 Social Security (Contributions) (Re-rating and National Insurance Fund Payments) Order 1997 (S.I. 1997/544)
 Social Security (Contributions) Amendment Regulations 1997 (S.I. 1997/545)
 Social Security (Incapacity for Work) (General) Amendment Regulations 1997 (S.I. 1997/546)
 Control of Pollution (Silage, Slurry and Agricultural Fuel Oil) (Amendment) Regulations 1997 (S.I. 1997/547)
 A30 Trunk Road (Hounslow and Hillingdon) Red Route (Clearway) Traffic Order 1996 Variation Order 1997 (S.I. 1997/548)
 A316 Trunk Road (Hounslow) Red Route (Clearway) Traffic Order 1995 Variation Order 1997 (S.I. 1997/549)
 A4 Trunk Road (Hounslow) Red Route (Clearway) Traffic Order 1996 Experimental Variation Order 1997 (S.I. 1997/550)
 Railway Safety (Miscellaneous Provisions) Regulations 1997 (S.I. 1997/553)
 A41 Trunk Road (Barnet) Red Route (Clearway) (No. 2) Traffic Order 1996 Variation Order 1997 (S.I. 1997/554)
 A205 Trunk Road (Lewisham) Red Route (Bus Lanes) Experimental Traffic Order 1997 (S.I. 1997/555)
 National Health Service (Dental Charges) Amendment Regulations 1997 (S.I. 1997/558)
 National Health Service (Charges for Drugs and Appliances) Amendment Regulations 1997 (S.I. 1997/559)
 Local Government Act 1988 (Defined Activities) (Exemptions) (England) Order 1997 (S.I. 1997/560)
 Local Government (Direct Labour Organisations) and Local Government Act 1988 (Competition) (Miscellaneous Amendment) (England) Regulations 1997 (S.I. 1997/561)
 Merchant Shipping (Light Dues) Regulations 1997 (S.I. 1997/562)
 Social Security (Jobseeker's Allowance and Mariners' Benefits) (Miscellaneous Amendments) Regulations 1997 (S.I. 1997/563)
 Motor Vehicles (Type Approval and Approval Marks) (Fees) Regulations 1997 (S.I. 1997/564)
 Vehicle Excise Duty (Immobilisation, Removal and Disposal of Vehicles) (Amendment) Regulations 1997 (S.I. 1997/565)
 National Police Records (Recordable Offences) (Amendment) Regulations 1997 S.I. 1997/566)
 Pesticides (Maximum Residue Levels in Crops, Food and Feeding Stuffs) (Amendment) Regulations 1997 (S.I. 1997/567)
 Rural Development Grants (Agriculture) (Wales) (Amendment) Regulations 1997 (S.I. 1997/568)
 Housing (Rights to Acquire) (Discount) (Wales) Order 1997 (S.I. 1997/569)
 Company Accounts (Disclosure of Directors' Emoluments) Regulations 1997 (S.I. 1997/570)
 Companies Act (Directors' Report) (Statement of Payment Practice Regulations 1997 (S.I. 1997/571)
 Education (Individual Pupils' Achievements) (Information) (Wales) Regulations 1997 (S.I. 1997/573)
 Statutory Maternity Pay (Compensation of Employers) Amendment Regulations 1997 (S.I. 1997/574)
 Social Security (Contributions) Amendment (No. 2) Regulations 1997 (S.I. 1997/575)
 Social Security Benefits Up-rating Regulations 1997 (S.I. 1997/576)
 Social Security (Industrial Injuries) (Dependency) (Permitted Earnings Limits) Order 1997 (S.I. 1997/577)
 Local Government Pension Scheme (Amendment) Regulations 1997 (S.I. 1997/578)
 Courts-Martial and Standing Civilian Courts (Army and Royal Air Force) (Additional Powers on Trial of Civilians) Regulations 1997 (S.I. 1997/579)
 Courts Martial Appeal (Amendment) Rules 1997 (S.I. 1997/580)
 Pontefract Hospitals National Health Service Trust Dissolution Order 1997 (S.I. 1997/581)
 Pinderfields and Pontefract Hospitals National Health Service Trust (Establishment) Order 1997 (S.I. 1997/582)
 Pinderfields Hospitals National Health Service Trust Dissolution Order 1997 (S.I. 1997/583)
 Housing Benefit (General) Amendment Regulations 1997 (S.I. 1997/584)
 National Health Service (Dental Charges) (Scotland) Amendment Regulations 1997 (S.I. 1997/585)
 Council Tax (Discounts) (Scotland) Amendment Order 1997 (S.I. 1997/586)
 Council Tax (Discounts) (Scotland) Amendment Regulations 1997 (S.I. 1997/587)
 Local Authorities (Members' Allowances) (Amendment) Regulations 1997 (S.I. 1997/589)
 A43 Trunk Road (Stamford Road, Weldon and Detrunking) Order 1997 (S.I. 1997/590)
 A21 Trunk Road (Vauxhall Junction Slip Roads) (Trunking ) Order 1997 (S.I. 1997/591)
 Housing Act 1996 (Commencement No. 9) Order 1997 (S.I. 1997/596)
 Education (Areas to which Pupils and Students Belong) (Amendment) Regulations 1997 (S.I. 1997/597)
 Local Government Pension Scheme (Transfers from the National Health Service Pension Scheme for England and Wales) Regulations 1997 (S.I. 1997/598)
 Education (Grant-maintained and Grant-maintained Special Schools) (Finance) (Wales) Regulations 1997 (S.I. 1997/599)

601-700
 Seeds (Miscellaneous Amendments) Regulations 1997 (S.I. 1997/616)
 Specified Bovine Material Order 1997 (S.I. 1997/617)
 Housing Act 1996 (Commencement No. 10 and Transitional Provisions) Order 1997 (S.I. 1997/618)
 Housing (Right to Acquire) Regulations 1997 (S.I. 1997/619)
 Housing (Right to Acquire or Enfranchise) (Designated Rural Areas in the West Midlands) Order 1997 (S.I. 1997/620)
 Housing (Right to Acquire or Enfranchise) (Designated Rural Areas in the South West) Order 1997 (S.I. 1997/621)
 Housing (Right to Acquire or Enfranchise) (Designated Rural Areas in the North West and Merseyside) Order 1997 (S.I. 1997/622)
 Housing (Right to Acquire or Enfranchise) (Designated Rural Areas in the East) Order 1997 (S.I. 1997/623)
 Housing (Right to Acquire or Enfranchise) (Designated Rural Areas in the North East) Order 1997 (S.I. 1997/624)
 Housing (Right to Acquire or Enfranchise) (Designated Rural Areas in the South East) Order 1997 (S.I. 1997/625)
 Housing (Right to Acquire) (Discount) Order 1997 (S.I. 1997/626)
 Housing Act 1996 (Consequential Amendments) (No. 2) Order 1997 (S.I. 1997/627)
 Homelessness (Persons subject to Immigration Control) (Amendment) Order 1997 (S.I. 1997/628)
 Electricity and Pipe-line Works (Assessment of Environmental Effects) (Amendment) Regulations 1997 (S.I. 1997/629)
 Measuring Instruments (EEC Requirements) (Fees) (Amendment) Regulations 1997 (S.I. 1997/630)
 Allocation of Housing and Homelessness (Amendment) Regulations 1997 (S.I. 1997/631)
 Street Litter Control Notices (Amendment) Order 1997 (S.I. 1997/632)
 Litter Control Areas (Amendment) Order 1997 (S.I. 1997/633)
 Pensions Increase (Review) Order 1997 (S.I. 1997/634)
 Vocational Training (Public Financial Assistance and Disentitlement to Tax Relief) (Amendment) Regulations 1997 (S.I. 1997/635)
 Divorce etc. (Pensions) (Amendment) Regulations 1997 (S.I. 1997/636)
 Family Proceedings (Amendment) Rules 1997 (S.I. 1997/637)
 Medicines (Medicated Animal Feeding Stuffs) (Amendment) Regulations 1997 (S.I. 1997/638)
 Animals (Third Country Imports) (Charges) Regulations 1997 (S.I. 1997/639)
 Leasehold Reform (Notices) Regulations 1997 (S.I. 1997/640)
 New Town (Irvine) Dissolution Order 1997 (S.I. 1997/641)
 New Town (Livingston) Dissolution Order 1997 (S.I. 1997/642)
 New Town (Cumbernauld) Dissolution Order 1997 (S.I. 1997/643)
 Child Maintenance Bonus (Northern Ireland Reciprocal Arrangements) Regulations 1997 (S.I. 1997/645)
 National Health Service (Injury Benefits) Amendment Regulations 1997 (S.I. 1997/646)
 Merchant Shipping (Ro-Ro Passenger Ship Survivability) Regulations 1997 (S.I. 1997/647)
 Producer Responsibility Obligations (Packaging Waste) Regulations 1997 (S.I. 1997/648)
 Adoption Agencies and Children (Arrangements for Placement and Reviews) (Miscellaneous Amendments) Regulations 1997 (S.I. 1997/649)
 Motor Cars (Driving Instruction) (Amendment) Regulations 1997 (S.I. 1997/650)
 Financial Assistance for Environmental Purposes Order 1997 (S.I. 1997/651)
 National Health Service Trusts (Originating Capital Debt) Order 1997 (S.I. 1997/652)
 Insurance (Fees) Regulations 1997 (S.I. 1997/653)
 Good Laboratory Practice Regulations 1997 (S.I. 1997/654)
 Plant Health (Fees) (Forestry) (Great Britain) (Amendment) Regulations 1997 (S.I. 1997/655)
 Council Tax (Chargeable Dwellings, Exempt Dwellings and Discount Disregards) Amendment Order 1997 (S.I. 1997/656)
 Council Tax (Additional Provisions for Discount Disregards) Amendment Regulations 1997 (S.I. 1997/657)
 Wine and Made-wine (Amendment) Regulations 1997 (S.I. 1997/658)
 Cider and Perry (Amendment) Regulations 1997 (S.I. 1997/659)
 Capital Allowances (Corresponding Northern Ireland Grants) Order 1997 (S.I. 1997/660)
 Vocational Training (Tax Relief) (Amendment) Regulations 1997 (S.I. 1997/661)
 Pensions (Polish Forces) Scheme (Extension) Order 1997 (S.I. 1997/662)
 Occupational Pension Schemes (Prohibition of Trustees) Regulations 1997 (S.I. 1997/663)
 Pensions Act 1995 (Commencement No. 10) Order 1997 (S.I. 1997/664)
 Occupational Pension Schemes (Pensions Compensation Provisions) Regulations 1997 (S.I. 1997/665)
 Occupational and Personal Pension Schemes (Levy) Regulations 1997 (S.I. 1997/666)
 Civil Aviation (Navigation Services Charges) (Second Amendment) Regulations 1997 (S.I. 1997/667)
 Vehicle Inspectorate Trading Fund (Appropriation of Additional Assets) Order 1997 (S.I. 1997/668)
 Motor Vehicles (Driving Licences) (Amendment) (No. 2) Regulations 1997 (S.I. 1997/669)
 Party Wall etc. Act 1996 (Commencement) Order 1997 (S.I. 1997/670)
 Party Wall etc. Act 1996 (Repeal of Local Enactments) Order 1997 (S.I. 1997/671)
 Local Government Staff Commission (Scotland) (Winding Up) Order 1997 (S.I. 1997/672)
 Council Tax (Dwellings) (Scotland) Regulations 1997 (S.I. 1997/673)
 Local Government Superannuation (Scotland) Amendment Regulations 1997 (S.I. 1997/674)
 Teachers (Compensation for Premature Retirement and Redundancy) (Scotland) Amendment Regulations 1997 (S.I. 1997/675)
 Teachers' Superannuation (Scotland) Amendment Regulations 1997 (S.I. 1997/676)
 Certification Officer (Amendment of Fees) Regulations 1997 (S.I. 1997/677)
 Education (Grant) (Amendment) Regulations 1997 (S.I. 1997/678)
 Local Government Changes for England (Education) (Miscellaneous Provisions) Order 1997 (S.I. 1997/679)
 Education (Amount to Follow Permanently Excluded Pupil) Regulations 1997 (S.I. 1997/680)
 Criminal Procedure and Investigations Act 1996 (Appointed Day No. 3) Order 1997 (S.I. 1997/682)
 Criminal Procedure and Investigations Act 1996 (Commencement) (Section 65 and Schedules 1 and 2) Order 1997 (S.I. 1997/683)
 Criminal Procedure and Investigations Act 1996 (Defence Disclosure Time Limits) Regulations 1997 (S.I. 1997/684)
 Reform and Housing (Excluded Tenancies) (Designated Rural Areas) (Wales) Order 1997 (S.I. 1997/685)
 Insurance (Lloyd's) Regulations 1997 (S.I. 1997/686)
 Sheriff Court Fees Order 1997 (S.I. 1997/687)
 Court of Session etc. Fees Order 1997 (S.I. 1997/688)
 Civil Legal Aid (Scotland) (Fees) Amendment Regulations 1997 (S.I. 1997/689)
 Legal Aid (Scotland) (Children) Regulations 1997 (S.I. 1997/690)
 Children (Scotland) Act 1995 etc. (Revocations and Savings) (Scotland) Regulations 1997 (S.I. 1997/691)
 Children's Hearings (Scotland) Rules 1986 etc. (Revocations) (Scotland) Rules 1997 (S.I. 1997/692)
 Community Care (Direct Payments) (Scotland) Regulations 1997 (S.I. 1997/693)
 Medical Devices Fees (Amendment) Regulations 1997 (S.I. 1997/694)
 Common Police Services (Scotland) Order 1997 (S.I. 1997/695)
 National Health Service (Pharmaceutical Services) (Scotland) Amendment Regulations 1997 (S.I. 1997/696)
 National Health Service (Charges for Drugs and Appliances) (Scotland) Amendment Regulations 1997 (S.I. 1997/697)
 Crown Court (Criminal Procedure and Investigations Act 1996) (Disclosure) Rules 1997 (S.I. 1997/698)
 Crown Court (Criminal Procedures and Investigations Act 1996) (Confidentiality) Rules 1997 (S.I. 1997/699)
 Crown Court (Advance Notice of Expert Evidence) (Amendment) Rules 1997 (S.I. 1997/700)

701-800
 Crown Court (Amendment) Rules 1997 (S.I. 1997/701)
 Criminal Appeal (Amendment) Rules 1997 (S.I. 1997/702)
 Magistrates' Courts (Criminal Procedure and Investigations Act 1996) (Disclosure) Rules 1997 (S.I. 1997/703)
 Magistrates' Courts (Criminal Procedure and Investigations Act 1996) (Confidentiality) Rules 1997 (S.I. 1997/704)
 Magistrates' Courts (Advance Notice of Expert Evidence) Rules 1997 (S.I. 1997/705)
 Magistrates' Courts (Amendment) Rules 1997 (S.I. 1997/706)
 Magistrates' Courts (Forms) (Amendment) Rules 1997 (S.I. 1997/707)
 Magistrates' Courts (Notices of Transfer) (Amendment) Rules 1997 (S.I. 1997/708)
 Magistrates' Courts (Notice of Transfer) (Children's Evidence) (Amendment) Rules 1997 (S.I. 1997/709)
 Justices' Clerks (Amendment) Rules 1997 (S.I. 1997/710)
 Indictments (Procedure) (Amendment) Rules 1997 (S.I. 1997/711)
 Electricity Generating Stations and Overhead Lines and Pipe-lines (Inquiries Procedure) (Amendment) Rules 1997 (S.I. 1997/712)
 Land Registration (Conduct of Business) Regulations 1997 (S.I. 1997/713)
 Reporters (Conduct of Proceedings before the Sheriff) (Scotland) Regulations 1997 (S.I. 1997/714)
 Grants for Pre-school Education (Scotland) Amendment Regulations 1997 (S.I. 1997/715)
 Registration of Births, Deaths, Marriages and Divorces (Fees) (Scotland) Regulations 1997 (S.I. 1997/716)
 Registration of Births, Deaths and Marriages (Fees) (Scotland) Order 1997 (S.I. 1997/717)
 Legal Aid in Contempt of Court Proceedings (Scotland) (Fees) Amendment Regulations 1997 (S.I. 1997/718)
 Criminal Legal Aid (Scotland) (Fees) Amendment Regulations 1997 (S.I. 1997/719)
 Local Government (Amendment of Regulations for Compensation on Reorganisation (Scotland) Regulations 1997 (S.I. 1997/720)
 Police Grant (Scotland) Order 1997 (S.I. 1997/721)
 Rural Diversification Programme (Scotland) Amendment Regulations 1997 (S.I. 1997/722)
 Food Premises (Registration) Amendment 1997 (S.I. 1997/723)
 Pensions Compensation Board (Determinations and Review Procedure) Regulations 1997 (S.I. 1997/724)
 Combined Probation Areas (Cleveland — Teesside) Order 1997 (S.I. 1997/725)
 Advice and Assistance (Scotland) Amendment Regulations 1997 (S.I. 1997/726)
 Civil Legal Aid (Scotland) Amendment Regulations 1997 (S.I. 1997/727)
 Council Tax (Exempt Dwellings) (Scotland) Order 1997 (S.I. 1997/728 (This SI has been corrected by S.I. 1998/561))
 Reporters (Appeals against Dismissal) (Scotland) Regulations 1997 (S.I. 1997/729)
 National Health Service (General Medical Services) Amendment Regulations 1997 (S.I. 1997/730)
 Workmen's Compensation (Supplementation) (Amendment) Scheme 1997 (S.I. 1997/731)
 Local Government Residual Body (England) (Amendment) Order 1997 (S.I. 1997/732)
 Dairy Produce Quotas Regulations 1997 (S.I. 1997/733)
 Community Care (Direct Payments) Regulations 1997 (S.I. 1997/734)
 Offshore Installations (Safety Zones) Order 1997 (S.I. 1997/735)
 Severn Trent Water Limited (Extension of Byelaws) Order 1997 (S.I. 1997/736)
 Criminal Justice Act 1987 (Notice of Transfer) (Amendment) Regulations 1997 (S.I. 1997/737)
 Criminal Justice Act 1991 (Notice of Transfer) (Amendment) Regulations 1997 (S.I. 1997/738)
 Prosecution of Offences (Revocation) Regulations 1997 (S.I. 1997/739)
 Building Societies (General Charge and Fees) Regulations 1997 (S.I. 1997/740)
 Friendly Societies (General Charge and Fees) Regulations 1997 (S.I. 1997/741)
 Industrial and Provident Societies (Credit Unions) (Amendment of Fees) Regulations 1997 (S.I. 1997/742)
 Industrial and Provident Societies (Amendment of Fees) Regulations 1997 (S.I. 1997/743)
 Children (Scotland) Act 1995 (Commencement No. 3) (Amendment and Transitional Provisions) Order 1997 (S.I. 1997/744)
 Divorce etc. (Pensions) (Scotland) Amendment Regulations 1997 (S.I. 1997/745)
 United Kingdom Central Council for Nursing, Midwifery and Health Visiting (Electoral Scheme) Variation Order 1997 (S.I. 1997/746)
 National Health Service (Fund-holding Practices) Amendment Regulations 1997 (S.I. 1997/747)
 National Health Service (Travelling Expenses and Remission of Charges) Amendment Regulations 1997 (S.I. 1997/748)
 Town and Country Planning (General Development Procedure) (Scotland) Amendment Order 1997 (S.I. 1997/749)
 Town and Country Planning Appeals (Determination by Appointed Person) (Inquiries Procedure) (Scotland) Rules 1997 (S.I. 1997/750)
 Legal Advice and Assistance (Amendment) Regulations 1997 (S.I. 1997/751)
 Legal Aid in Criminal and Care Proceedings (General) (Amendment) Regulations 1997 (S.I. 1997/752)
 Civil Legal Aid (Assessment of Resources) (Amendment) Regulations 1997 (S.I. 1997/753)
 Legal Aid in Criminal and Care Proceedings (Costs) (Amendment) Regulations 1997 (S.I. 1997/754)
 Education (School Teachers' Pay and Conditions) Order 1997 (S.I. 1997/755)
 Community Care (Direct Payments) Act 1996 (Commencement) Order 1997 (S.I. 1997/756)
 Enzootic Bovine Leukosis Order 1997 (S.I. 1997/757)
 Brucellosis Order 1997 (S.I. 1997/758)
 Isles of Scilly (Direct Payments Act) Order 1997 (S.I. 1997/759)
 Treasure Act 1996 (Commencement No. 1) Order 1997 (S.I. 1997/760)
 City of Manchester (Egerton Street Service Bridge Scheme) 1994 Confirmation Instrument 1997 (S.I. 1997/761)
 City of Manchester (Egerton Street West Bridge Scheme) 1994 Confirmation Instrument 1997 (S.I. 1997/762)
 A127 Trunk Road (M25 To Rayleigh Section and Slip Roads) (Detrunking) Order 1997 (S.I. 1997/763)
 A570 Trunk Road (Southport–Pinfold) (40 Miles Per Hour Speed Limit) Order 1997 (S.I. 1997/773)
 Parliamentary Elections (Returning Officer's Charges) (Northern Ireland) Order 1997 (S.I. 1997/774)
 Borough of Thurrock (Electoral Changes) Order 1997 (S.I. 1997/775)
 District of the Medway Towns (Parishes and Electoral Changes) Order 1997 (S.I. 1997/776)
 City of Peterborough (Parishes and Electoral Changes) Order 1997 (S.I. 1997/777)
 Rent Officers (Housing Renewal Grants Functions) Order 1997 (S.I. 1997/778)
 Borough of Halton (Electoral Changes) Order 1997 (S.I. 1997/779)
 District of The Wrekin (Parishes and Electoral Changes) Order 1997 (S.I. 1997/780)
 Borough of Warrington (Parishes and Electoral Changes) Order 1997 (S.I. 1997/781)
 Borough of Blackburn (Parishes and Electoral Changes) Order 1997 (S.I. 1997/782)
 Borough of Blackpool (Electoral Changes) Order 1997 (S.I. 1997/783)
 Occupational Pension Schemes (Discharge of Liability) Regulations 1997 (S.I. 1997/784)
 Occupational Pension Schemes (Assignment, Forfeiture, Bankruptcy etc.) Regulations 1997 (S.I. 1997/785)
 Personal and Occupational Pension Schemes (Miscellaneous Amendments) Regulations 1997 (S.I. 1997/786)
 County Court Fees (Amendment) Order 1997 (S.I. 1997/787)
 Family Proceedings Fees (Amendment) Order 1997 (S.I. 1997/788)
 Young Offender Institution (Amendment) Rules 1997 (S.I. 1997/789)
 Home Energy Efficiency Scheme Regulations 1997 (S.I. 1997/790)
 Jobseeker's Allowance (Workskill Courses) Pilot Regulations 1997 (S.I. 1997/791)
 Social Security (Social Fund and Claims and Payments) (Miscellaneous Amendments) Regulations 1997 (S.I. 1997/792)
 Social Security (Miscellaneous Amendments) (No. 2) Regulations 1997 (S.I. 1997/793)
 Occupational Pensions Regulatory Authority (Determinations and Review Procedure) Regulations 1997 (S.I. 1997/794)
 Act of Sedurant (Rules of the Court of Session Amendment No. 1) (Part I Orders) 1997 (S.I. 1997/795)
 Town and Country Planning (Inquiries Procedure) (Scotland) Rules 1997 (S.I. 1997/796)
 Homelessness (Isles of Scilly) Order 1997 (S.I. 1997/797)
 Reserve Forces Appeal Tribunals Rules 1997 (S.I. 1997/798)
 Electricity (Non-Fossil Fuel Sources) (Scotland) Order 1997 (S.I. 1997/799)

801-900
 Mental Health (Hospital, Guardianship and Consent to Treatment) Amendment Regulations 1997 (S.I. 1997/801)
 Child Support Commissioners (Procedure) (Amendment) Regulations 1997 (S.I. 1997/802)
 Energy Information (Washing Machines) (Amendment) Regulations 1997 (S.I. 1997/803)
 Medicines Control Agency Trading Fund (Variation) Order 1997 (S.I. 1997/805)
 Family Credit and Disability Allowance (General) Amendment Regulations 1997 (S.I. 1997/806)
 Prevention of Terrorism (Temporary Provisions) Act 1989 (Continuance) Order 1997 (S.I. 1997/807)
 Combined Probation Areas (Lincolnshire) Order 1997 (S.I. 1997/808)
 Local Authorities (Goods and Services) (Public Bodies) (Greater London Enterprise Limited) Order 1997 (S.I. 1997/809)
 Social Security (Industrial Injuries) (Miscellaneous Amendments) Regulations 1997 (S.I. 1997/810)
 War Pensions (Mercantile Marine) (Amendment) Scheme 1997 (S.I. 1997/811)
 Personal Injuries (Civilians) Amendment Scheme 1997 (S.I. 1997/812)
 Bovine Hides Regulations 1997 (S.I. 1997/813)
 Sweeteners in Food (Amendment) Regulations 1997 (S.I. 1997/814)
 Motor Vehicle Tyres (Safety) (Amendment) Regulations 1997 (S.I. 1997/815)
 Financial Services Act 1986 (Corporate Debt Exemption) Order 1997 (S.I. 1997/816)
 Banking Act 1987 (Exempt Transactions ) Regulations 1997 (S.I. 1997/817)
 National Health Service (Optical Charges and Payments) Regulations 1997 (S.I. 1997/818)
 Occupational Pension Schemes (Reference Scheme and Miscellaneous Amendments) Regulations 1997 (S.I. 1997/819)
 Social Security (Contributions) Amendment (No. 3) Regulations 1997 (S.I. 1997/820)
 Channel Tunnel Rail Link (Planning Appeals) Regulations 1997 (S.I. 1997/821)
 Channel Tunnel Rail Link (Fees for Requests for Planning Approval) Regulations 1997 (S.I. 1997/822)
 Workmen's Compensation (Supplementation) (Amendment) (No. 2) Scheme 1997 (S.I. 1997/823)
 Pneumoconiosis, Byssinosis and Miscellaneous Diseases Benefit (Amendment) Scheme 1997 (S.I. 1997/824)
 Gas (Extent of Domestic Supply Licences) Order 1997 (S.I. 1997/826)
 Social Security and Child Support (Miscellaneous Amendments) Regulations 1997 (S.I. 1997/827)
 Farm Woodland (Amendment) Scheme 1997 (S.I. 1997/828)
 Farm Woodland Premium Scheme 1997 (S.I. 1997/829)
 Loch Ewe, Isle of Ewe, Wester Ross, Scallops Several Fishery Order 1997 (S.I. 1997/830)
 Lifts Regulations 1997 (S.I. 1997/831)
 West Cheshire National Health Service Trust Dissolution Order 1997 (S.I. 1997/832)
 Wirral and West Cheshire Community National Health Service Trust (Establishment) Order 1997 (S.I. 1997/833)
 Wirral Community Healthcare National Health Service Trust Dissolution Order 1997 (S.I. 1997/834)
 Calderdale Healthcare National Health Service Trust (Establishment) Amendment Order 1997 (S.I. 1997/835)
 Worcester Royal Infirmary National Health Service Trust (Establishment) Amendment Order 1997 (S.I. 1997/836)
 Carlisle Hospitals National Health Service Trust (Establishment) Amendment Order 1997 (S.I. 1997/837)
 Caribbean Development Bank (Further Payments) Order 1997 (S.I. 1997/838)
 African Development Fund (Seventh Replenishment) Order 1997 (S.I. 1997/839)
 International Development Association (Interim Trust Fund) Order 1997 (S.I. 1997/840)
 Civil Procedure Act 1997 (Commencement No. 1) Order 1997 (S.I. 1997/841)
 A406 London North Circular Trunk Road (East London River Crossing (A13 to A2)) Orders 1988 and 1991, Revocation Order 1997 (S.I. 1997/842)
 Registration of Births and Deaths (Amendment) Regulations 1997 (S.I. 1997/844)
 Local Government Act 1988 (Defined Activities) (Exemption) (Rushcliffe Borough Council) Order 1997 (S.I. 1997/845)
 Motor Vehicles (Driving Licences) (Amendment) (No. 3) Regulations 1997 (S.I. 1997/846)
 M4 Motorway (Heathrow Airport Spur Road) (Bus Lane) Regulations 1997 (S.I. 1997/847)
 Local Authorities (Capital Finance) (Amendment) Regulations 1997 (S.I. 1997/848)
 Local Authorities (Goods and Services) (Public Bodies) (Trunk Roads) (Amendment) Order 1997 (S.I. 1997/849)
 Local Authorities (Goods and Services) (Public Bodies) (Trunk Roads) (No. 2) Order 1997 (S.I. 1997/850)
 Superannuation (Admission to Schedule 1 to the Superannuation Act 1972) (No. 3) Order 1997 (S.I. 1997/851)
 Housing Benefit and Council Tax Benefit (General) Amendment Regulations 1997 (S.I. 1997/852)
 Act of Sederunt (Rules of the Court of Session Amendment No. 2) (Adoption Applications) 1997 (S.I. 1997/853)
 Act of Sederunt (Rules of the Court of Session Amendment No. 3) (Human Fertilisation and Embryology) 1997 (S.I. 1997/854)
 Medicines (Bal Jivan Chamcho Prohibition) (No. 2) Amendment Order 1997 (S.I. 1997/856)
 Welfare Food (Amendment) Regulations 1997 (S.I. 1997/857)
 Town and Country Planning (General Development Procedure) (Amendment) Order 1997 (S.I. 1997/858)
 Amusement Machine Licence Duty (Amendment) Regulations 1997 (S.I. 1997/859)
 Education (Inner London Education Authority) (Property Transfer) (Modification and Amendment) Order 1997 (S.I. 1997/860)
 House of Commons Disqualification Order 1997 (S.I. 1997/861)
 Local Authorities (Armorial Bearings) Order 1997 (S.I. 1997/862)
 European Communities (Definition of Treaties) (Euro-Mediterranean Agreement establishing an Association between the European Communities and their Member States and the State of Israel) Order 1997 (S.I. 1997/863)
 Falkland Islands Constitution (Amendment) Order 1997 (S.I. 1997/864)
 Appropriation (Northern Ireland) Order 1997 (S.I. 1997/865)
 Education (Northern Ireland) Order 1997 (S.I. 1997/866)
 Local Elections (Northern Ireland) (Amendment) Order 1997 (S.I. 1997/867)
 Local Elections (Variation of Limits of Candidates' Election Expenses) (Northern Ireland) Order 1997 (S.I. 1997/868)
 Race Relations (Northern Ireland) Order 1997 (S.I. 1997/869)
 European Convention on Cinematographic Co-production (Amendment) Order 1997 (S.I. 1997/870)
 Social Security (Jamaica) Order 1997 (S.I. 1997/871)
 Housing (Prescribed Forms) (Amendment) Regulations 1997 (S.I. 1997/872)
 Driving Standards Agency Trading Fund Order 1997 (S.I. 1997/873)
 European Parliamentary Elections (Amentment) Regulations 1997 (S.I. 1997/874)
 Derwen National Health Service Trust (Dissolution) Order 1997 (S.I. 1997/875)
 Pembrokeshire and Derwen National Health Service Trust (Establishment) Order 1997 (S.I. 1997/876)
 Pembrokeshire National Health Service Trust (Dissolution) Order 1997 (S.I. 1997/877)
 Water Undertakers (Extension of Byelaws) Order 1997 (S.I. 1997/878)
 Representation of the People (Variation of Limits of Candidates' Election Expenses) Order 1997 (S.I. 1997/879)
 Representation of the People (Amendment) Regulations 1997 (S.I. 1997/880)
 Air Navigation (General) (Amendment) Regulations 1997 (S.I. 1997/881)
 Criminal Justice and Public Order Act 1994 (Commencement No. 11 and Transitional Provision) Order 1997 (S.I. 1997/882)
 Sea Fishing (Enforcement of Community Quota Measures) Order 1997 (S.I. 1997/883)
 Plant Protection Products (Fees) (Amendment) Regulations 1997 (S.I. 1997/884)
 Public Telecommunication System Designation (ACC Long Distance UK Ltd) Order 1997 (S.I. 1997/886)
 Public Telecommunication System Designation (AT&T Communications (UK) Ltd) Order 1997 (S.I. 1997/887)
 Public Telecommunication System Designation (CableTel (UK) Ltd) Order 1997 (S.I. 1997/888)
 Public Telecommunication System Designation (COLT Telecommunications) Order 1997 (S.I. 1997/889)
 Public Telecommunication System Designation (Communicorp (UK) Ltd) Order 1997 (S.I. 1997/890)
 Public Telecommunication System Designation (Concert Communications Company) Order 1997 (S.I. 1997/891)
 Public Telecommunication System Designation (Convergence Ventures Ltd) Order 1997 (S.I. 1997/892)
 Public Telecommunication System Designation (Energis Communications Ltd) Order 1997 (S.I. 1997/893)
 Public Telecommunication System Designation (Esat Telecommunications (UK) Ltd) Order 1997 (S.I. 1997/894)
 Public Telecommunication System Designation (Esprit Telecom UK Ltd) Order 1997 (S.I. 1997/895)
 Public Telecommunication System Designation (Eurotunnel) Order 1997 (S.I. 1997/896)
 Public Telecommunication System Designation (Facilicom International (UK) Ltd) Order 1997 (S.I. 1997/897)
 Public Telecommunication System Designation (Frontel Newco Ltd) Order 1997 (S.I. 1997/898)
 Public Telecommunication System Designation (Global One Communications Holding Ltd) Order 1997 (S.I. 1997/899)
 Public Telecommunication System Designation (Hermes Europe Railtel B.V.) Order 1997 (S.I. 1997/900)

901-1000
 Public Telecommunication System Designation (Spacetel International Ltd) Order 1997 (S.I. 1997/901)
 Public Telecommunication System Designation (ScottishPower Telecommunications Ltd) Order 1997 (S.I. 1997/902)
 Public Telecommunication System Designation (RSL Communications Ltd) Order 1997 (S.I. 1997/903)
 Public Telecommunication System Designation (Racal Telecommunications Ltd) Order 1997 (S.I. 1997/904)
 Public Telecommunication System Designation (Primus Telecommunications Ltd) Order 1997 (S.I. 1997/905)
 Public Telecommunication System Designation (MCI Telecommunications Ltd) Order 1997 (S.I. 1997/906)
 Public Telecommunication System Designation (National Transcommunications Ltd) Order 1997 (S.I. 1997/907)
 Public Telecommunication System Designation (MFS Communications Ltd) Order 1997 (S.I. 1997/908)
 Public Telecommunication System Designation (L D I Communications Ltd) Order 1997 (S.I. 1997/909)
 Public Telecommunication System Designation (Pacific Gateway Exchange (UK) Ltd) Order 1997 (S.I. 1997/910)
 Public Telecommunication System Designation (Interoute Networks Ltd) Order 1997 (S.I. 1997/911)
 Public Telecommunication System Designation (Incom (UK) Ltd) Order 1997 (S.I. 1997/912)
 Public Telecommunication System Designation (ITG (UK) Ltd) Order 1997 (S.I. 1997/913)
 Public Telecommunication System Designation (IXNET UK Ltd) Order 1997 (S.I. 1997/914)
 Public Telecommunication System Designation (Net. Net Ltd) Order 1997 (S.I. 1997/915)
 Public Telecommunication System Designation (Advanced Business Services Ltd) Order 1997 (S.I. 1997/916)
 Public Telecommunication System Designation (Star Europe Ltd) Order 1997 (S.I. 1997/917)
 Public Telecommunication System Designation (TeleBermuda International (UK) Ltd) Order 1997 (S.I. 1997/918)
 Public Telecommunication System Designation (Telecom New Zealand Ltd) Order 1997 (S.I. 1997/919)
 Public Telecommunication System Designation (Teleglobe International (UK) Ltd) Order 1997 (S.I. 1997/920)
 Public Telecommunication System Designation (TMI TeleMedia International Ltd) Order 1997 (S.I. 1997/921)
 Public Telecommunication System Designation (Teleport London International Ltd) Order 1997 (S.I. 1997/922)
 Public Telecommunication System Designation (Telewest Communications plc) (No. 2) Order 1997 (S.I. 1997/923)
 Public Telecommunication System Designation (Telia UK Ltd) Order 1997 (S.I. 1997/924)
 Public Telecommunication System Designation (Telstra (UK) Ltd) Order 1997 (S.I. 1997/925)
 Public Telecommunication System Designation (Torch Communications Ltd) Order 1997 (S.I. 1997/926)
 Public Telecommunication System Designation (Unisource Holding (UK) Ltd) Order 1997 (S.I. 1997/927)
 Public Telecommunication System Designation (Videotron No. 2 Ltd) Order 1997 (S.I. 1997/928)
 Public Telecommunication System Designation (Vodafone Ltd) Order 1997 (S.I. 1997/929)
 Public Telecommunication System Designation (Worldcom International Inc) Order 1997 (S.I. 1997/930)
 Third Country Fishing (Enforcement) Order 1997 (S.I. 1997/931)
 Jobseeker's Allowance (Members of the Forces) (Northern Ireland) Regulations 1997 (S.I. 1997/932)
 Queen Elizabeth II Conference Centre Trading Fund Order 1997 (S.I. 1997/933)
 Local Government Act 1988 (Defined Activities) (Housing Management) (Exemptions) (Wales) Order 1997 (S.I. 1997/934)
 Local Government Act 1988 (Competition) (Housing Management) (Wales) Regulations 1997 (S.I. 1997/935)
 Companies Act 1985 (Audit Exemption) (Amendment) Regulations 1997 (S.I. 1997/936)
 Gas (Calculation of Thermal Energy) (Amendment) Regulations 1997 (S.I. 1997/937)
 Local Government Finance (Scotland) Order 1997 (S.I. 1997/938)
 Revenue Support Grant (Scotland) Order 1997 (S.I. 1997/939)
 Housing Support Grant (Scotland) Order 1997 (S.I. 1997/940)
 Deregulation (Gaming on Sunday in Scotland) Order 1997 (S.I. 1997/941)
 Gaming Clubs (Hours and Charges) (Scotland) Amendment Regulations 1997 (S.I. 1997/942)
 National Health Service (General Medical Services) (Scotland) Amendment Regulations 1997 (S.I. 1997/943)
 Income Support (General) (Standard Interest Rate Amendment) Regulations 1997 (S.I. 1997/944)
 Housing (Right to Buy) (Priority of Charges) Order 1997 (S.I. 1997/945)
 Occupational Pension Schemes (Age-related Payments) Regulations 1997 (S.I. 1997/946)
 Deregulation (Betting Licensing) Order 1997 (S.I. 1997/947)
 Ipswich Port Authority Transfer Scheme 1996 Confirmation Order 1997 (S.I. 1997/948)
 Courses for Drink-Drive Offenders (Experimental Period) Order 1997 (S.I. 1997/949)
 Deregulation (Casinos) Order 1997 (S.I. 1997/950)
 Local Government Pension Scheme (Provision of Information, Administrative Expenses and Restitution) Regulations 1997 (S.I. 1997/954)
 Social Security (Adjudication) and Commissioners Procedure and Child Support Commissioners (Procedure) Amendment Regulations 1997 (S.I. 1997/955)
 Education (New Grant-maintained Schools) (Finance) Regulations 1997 (S.I. 1997/956)
 Deregulation (Employment in Bars) Order 1997 (S.I. 1997/957)
 Fire Services (Appointments and Promotion) (Amendment) Regulations 1997 (S.I. 1997/959)
 Non-Domestic Rating (Chargeable Amounts for Small Hereditaments) Amendment Regulations 1997 (S.I. 1997/960)
 British Gas plc (Rateable Values) (Amendment) Order 1997 (S.I. 1997/961)
 Contracting Out (functions of the Registrar General in relation to authorising re-registration of births) Order 1997 (S.I. 1997/962)
 Financial Services Act 1986 (Investment Advertisements) (Exemptions) Order 1997 (S.I. 1997/963)
 Charities (Dormant Accounts) (Scotland) Amendment Regulations 1997 (S.I. 1997/964)
 Grants for Improvement of School Security (Scotland) Regulations 1997 (S.I. 1997/965)
 Friendly Societies (Insurance Business) (Amendment) Regulations 1997 (S.I. 1997/966)
 Representation of the People (Northern Ireland) (Amendment) Regulations 1997 (S.I. 1997/967)
 Sheep Scab Order 1997 (S.I. 1997/968)
 European Parliamentary Elections (Northern Ireland) (Amendment) Regulations 1997 (S.I. 1997/969)
 Environmentally Sensitive Areas (Cambrian Mountains) Designation (Amendment) Order 1997 (S.I. 1997/970)
 Environmentally Sensitive Areas (Cambrian Mountains — Extension) Designation (Amendment) Order 1997 (S.I. 1997/971)
 Environmentally Sensitive Areas (Lleyn Peninsula) Designation (Amendment) Order 1997 (S.I. 1997/972)
 Environmentally Sensitive Areas (Clwydian Range) Designation (Amendment) Order 1997 (S.I. 1997/973)
 Environmentally Sensitive Areas (Preseli) Designation (Amendment) Order 1997 (S.I. 1997/974)
 Environmentally Sensitive Areas (Ynys Môn) Designation (Amendment) Order 1997 (S.I. 1997/975)
 Environmentally Sensitive Areas (Radnor) Designation (Amendment) Order 1997 (S.I. 1997/976)
 Housing Renewal Grants (Amendment) Regulations 1997 (S.I. 1997/977)
 Housing Renewal Grants (Prescribed Form and Particulars) (Amendment) Regulations 1997 (S.I. 1997/978)
 Representation of the People (Scotland) Amendment Regulations 1997 (S.I. 1997/979)
 National Health Service (Indicative Amounts) Regulations 1997 (S.I. 1997/980)
 National Health Service (General Medical Services) Amendment (No. 2) Regulations 1997 (S.I. 1997/981)
 Jobseeker's Allowance (Contract for Work) Regulations 1997 (S.I. 1997/982)
 Jobseeker's Allowance (Project Work Pilot Scheme) Regulations 1997 (S.I. 1997/983)
 Jobseeker's Allowance (Project Work Pilot Scheme) (No. 2) Regulations 1997 (S.I. 1997/984)
 Public Works Loans (Fees) (Amendment) Regulations 1997 (S.I. 1997/985)
 Deregulation (Validity of Civil Preliminaries to Marriage) Order 1997 (S.I. 1997/986)
 Stock Lending and Manufactured Payments (Revocations and Amendments) Regulations 1997 (S.I. 1997/987)
 Income Tax (Manufactured Overseas Dividends) (Amendment) Regulations 1997 (S.I. 1997/988)
 Electricity (Class Exemptions from the Requirement for a Licence) Order 1997 (S.I. 1997/989)
 Nitrate Sensitive Areas (Amendment) Regulations 1997 (S.I. 1997/990)
 Finance Act 1997, Schedule 10 (Appointed Day) Order 1997 (S.I. 1997/991)
 Manufactured Interest (Tax) Regulations 1997 (S.I. 1997/992)
 Manufactured Dividends (Tax) Regulations 1997 (S.I. 1997/993)
 Free Zone (Port of Sheerness) (Substitution of Responsible Authority) Order 1997 (S.I. 1997/994)
 Education (School Inspection) (No. 2) (Amendment) Regulations 1997 (S.I. 1997/995)
 Education (Grant-maintained and Grant-maintained Special Schools) (Finance) Regulations 1997 (S.I. 1997/996)
 Legal Advice and Assistance (Scope) (Amendment) Regulations 1997 (S.I. 1997/997)
 Legal Aid (Functions) Order 1997 (S.I. 1997/998)
 Local Authorities (Direct Labour Organisations) (Competition) (Wales) Regulations 1997 (S.I. 1997/999)
 Rent Officers (Additional Functions) (Amendment) Order 1997 (S.I. 1997/1000)

1001-1100
 Misuse of Drugs (Supply to Addicts) Regulations 1997 (S.I. 1997/1001)
 Kingston and District Community National Health Service Trust (Establishment) Amendment Order 1997 (S.I. 1997/1002)
 Rent Officers (Additional Functions) (Scotland) Amendment Order 1997 (S.I. 1997/1003)
 Housing Benefit and Council Tax Benefit (Subsidy) Order 1997 (S.I. 1997/1004)
 Broadcasting Act 1996 (Commencement No. 2) Order 1997 (S.I. 1997/1005)
 Wireless Telegraphy (Licence Charges) (Amendment) Regulaltions 1997 (S.I. 1997/1006)
 Dual-Use and Related Goods (Export Control) (Amendment No. 2) Regulations 1997 (S.I. 1997/1007)
 Export of Goods (Control) (Amendment No. 2) Order 1997 (S.I. 1997/1008)
 Social Security (Incapacity for Work and Severe Disablement Allowance) Amendment Regulations 1997 (S.I. 1997/1009)
 Legal Aid in Criminal and Care Proceedings (Costs) (Amendment) (No. 2) Regulations 1997 (S.I. 1997/1010)
 London Priority Route (Amendment) Order 1997 (S.I. 1997/1011)
 National Health Service (Travelling Expenses and Remission of Charges) (Scotland) Amendment Regulations 1997 (S.I. 1997/1012)
 National Health Service (Optical Charges and Payments) (Scotland) Amendment Regulations 1997 (S.I. 1997/1013)
 National Health Service (Fund-Holding Practices) (Scotland) Regulations 1997 (S.I. 1997/1014)
 Finance Act 1996, section 197, (Appointed Day) Order 1997 (S.I. 1997/1015)
 Air Passenger Duty and Other Indirect Taxes (Interest Rate) Regulations 1997 (S.I. 1997/1016)
 Criminal Procedure and Investigations Act 1996 (Appointed Day No. 4) Order 1997 (S.I. 1997/1019)
 Criminal Procedure and Investigations Act 1996 (Code of Practice) (No. 2) Order 1997 (S.I. 1997/1033)
 Parliamentary Elections (Returning Officers' Charges) Order 1997 (S.I. 1997/1034)
 Social Security (Contributions) Amendment (No. 4) Regulations 1997 (S.I. 1997/1045)
 Northern Ireland (Entry to Negotiations, etc.) Act 1996 (Cessation of Section 3) Order 1997 (S.I. 1997/1046)
 British Gas plc. (Rateable Values) (Scotland) Amendment Order 1997 (S.I. 1997/1048)
 Education Authority Bursaries and Students' Allowances (Scotland) Amendment Regulations 1997 (S.I. 1997/1049)
 Act of Sederunt (Rules of the Court of Session Amendment No. 4) (Miscellaneous) 1997 (S.I. 1997/1050)
 Criminal Justice Act 1987 (Preparatory Hearings) Rules 1997 (S.I. 1997/1051)
 Criminal Procedure and Investigations Act 1996 (Preparatory Hearings) Rules 1997 (S.I. 1997/1052)
 Criminal Procedure and Investigations Act 1996 (Preparatory Hearings) (Interlocutory Appeals) Rules 1997 (S.I. 1997/1053)
 Crown Court (Criminal Procedure and Investigations Act 1996) (Tainted Acquittals) Rules 1997 (S.I. 1997/1054)
 Magistrates' Courts (Criminal Procedure and Investigations Act 1996) (Tainted Acquittals) Rules 1997 (S.I. 1997/1055)
 Family Proceedings (Amendment No. 2) Rules 1997 (S.I. 1997/1056)
 Combined Probation Areas (West Midlands) Order 1997 (S.I. 1997/1059)
 Data Protection (Regulation of Financial Services etc.) (Subject Access Exemption) (Amendment) Order 1997 (S.I. 1997/1060)
 Licensed Betting Offices (Amendment) Regulations 1997 (S.I. 1997/1071)
 Gaming (Records of Cheques and Debit Card Payments) Regulations 1997 (S.I. 1997/1072)
 Deregulation (Football Pools) Order 1997 (S.I. 1997/1073)
 Deregulation (Betting and Bingo Advertising etc.) Order 1997 (S.I. 1997/1074)
 Deregulation (Casinos and Bingo Clubs: Debit Cards) Order 1997 (S.I. 1997/1075)
 Firearms (Amendment) Act 1997 (Commencement) (No. 1) Order 1997 (S.I. 1997/1076)
 Family Law Act 1996 (Commencement No. 1) Order 1997 (S.I. 1997/1077)
 Legal Aid (Mediation in Family Matters) Regulations 1997 (S.I. 1997/1078)
 Civil Legal Aid (General) (Amendment No. 2) Regulations 1997 (S.I. 1997/1079)
 Family Proceedings Fees (Amendment) (No. 2) Order 1997 (S.I. 1997/1080)
 Timeshare Regulations 1997 (S.I. 1997/1081)
 Merchant Shipping and Maritime Security Act 1997 (Commencement No. 1) Order 1997 (S.I. 1997/1082)
 Essex and Herts Community National Health Service Trust (Transfer of Trust Property) Order 1997 (S.I. 1997/1083)
 Reporters (Conduct of Proceedings before the Sheriff) (Scotland) (Amendment) Regulations 1997 (S.I. 1997/1084)
 Civil Courts (Amendment) (No. 2) Order 1997 (S.I. 1997/1085)
 Value Added Tax (Amendment) Regulations 1997 (S.I. 1997/1086)
 Sheffield Development Corporation (Dissolution) Order 1997 (S.I. 1997/1091)
 Local Government Act 1988 (Defined Activities) (Exemption) (Daventry District Council) Order 1997 (S.I. 1997/1092)
 Dairy Produce Quotas (Amendment) (Time Limits) Regulations 1997 (S.I. 1997/1093)
 Licensed Betting Offices (Scotland) Amendment Regulations 1997 (S.I. 1997/1095)
 Road Vehicles (Construction and Use) (Amendment) (No. 2) Regulations 1997 (S.I. 1997/1096)
 Local Government and Rating Act 1997 (Commencement No. 1) Order 1997 (S.I. 1997/1097)
 New Drivers (Appeals Procedure) Regulations 1997 (S.I. 1997/1098)

1101-1200
 Town and Country Planning (Compensation for Restrictions on Mineral Working and Mineral Waste Depositing) Regulations 1997 (S.I. 1997/1111)
 Civil Legal Aid (Financial Conditions) (Scotland) Regulations 1997 (S.I. 1997/1112)
 Advice and Assistance (Financial Conditions) (Scotland) Regulations 1997 (S.I. 1997/1113)
 Northern Ireland (Emergency and Prevention of Terrorism Provisions) (Continuance) Order 1997 (S.I. 1997/1114)
 West of Scotland Water Authority (Dervaig-River Bellart) Water Order 1997 (S.I. 1997/1115)
 London Cab Order 1997 (S.I. 1997/1116)
 Social Security Revaluation of Earnings Factors Order 1997 (S.I. 1997/1117)
 Act of Sederunt (Fees of Shorthand Writers in the Sheriff Court) (Amendment) 1997 (S.I. 1997/1118)
 Professions Supplementary to Medicine (Arts Therapists Board) Order of Council 1997 (S.I. 1997/1121)
 A40 Trunk Road (Western Avenue, Ealing) (Prescribed Routes) Order 1997 (S.I. 1997/1122)
 Deregulation (Occasional Permissions) Order 1997 (S.I. 1997/1133)
 Crown Agents Act 1995 (Appointed Day) Order 1997 (S.I. 1997/1139)
 Crown Agents Act 1995 (Successor Company) Order 1997 (S.I. 1997/1140)
 Deregulation (Provision of School Action Plans) Order 1997 (S.I. 1997/1142)
 Local Government Superannuation (Scottish Environment Protection Agency) (Scotland) Regulations 1997 (S.I. 1997/1143)
 Plant Health (Great Britain) (Amendment) Order 1997 (S.I. 1997/1145)
 Integrated Administration and Control System (Amendment) Regulations 1997 (S.I. 1997/1148)
 Foreign Satellite Service Proscription Order 1997 (S.I. 1997/1150)
 Dangerous Dogs (Amendment) Act 1997 (Commencement) Order 1997 (S.I. 1997/1151)
 Dangerous Dogs (Fees) Order 1997 (S.I. 1997/1152)
 Education Act 1997 (Commencement No. 1) Order 1997 (S.I. 1997/1153)
 Open-ended Investment Companies (Tax) Regulations 1997 (S.I. 1997/1154)
 Exchange Gains and Losses (Insurance Companies) (Amendment) Regulations 1997 (S.I. 1997/1155)
 Stamp Duty and Stamp Duty Reserve Tax (Open-ended Investment Companies) Regulations 1997 (S.I. 1997/1156)
 Insurance Premium Tax (Amendment) Regulations 1997 (S.I. 1997/1157)
 Income Tax (Schedule 22 to the Finance Act 1995) (Prescribed Amounts) Regulations 1997 (S.I. 1997/1158)
 Police and Criminal Evidence Act 1984 (Codes of Practice No. 4) Order 1997 (S.I. 1997/1159)
 Hedgerows Regulations 1997 (S.I. 1997/1160)
 Worcester College of Agriculture (Dissolution) Order 1997 (S.I. 1997/1168)
 Southampton University Hospitals National Health Service Trust (Transfer of Trust Property) Order 1997 (S.I. 1997/1171)
 Southampton Community Health Services National Health Service Trust (Transfer of Trust Property) Order 1997 (S.I. 1997/1172)
 South and West Devon Health Authority (Transfers of Trust Property) Order 1997 (S.I. 1997/1173)
 European Communities (Designation) Order 1997 (S.I. 1997/1174)
 Iraq and Kuwait (United Nations Sanctions) (Dependent Territories) (Amendment) Order 1997 (S.I. 1997/1175)
 Brazil (Extradition) Order 1997 (S.I. 1997/1176)
 Health Services (Primary Care) (Northern Ireland) Order 1997 (S.I. 1997/1177)
 Hong Kong (Extradition) Order 1997 (S.I. 1997/1178)
 Property (Northern Ireland) Order 1997 (S.I. 1997/1179)
 Protection from Harassment (Northern Ireland) Order 1997 (S.I. 1997/1180)
 Public Order (Amendment) (Northern Ireland) Order 1997 (S.I. 1997/1181)
 Social Security Administration (Fraud) (Northern Ireland) Order 1997 (S.I. 1997/1182)
 Social Security (Recovery of Benefits) (Northern Ireland) Order 1997 (S.I. 1997/1183)
 Deregulation (Non-Fossil Fuel) Order 1997 (S.I. 1997/1185)
 South Lincolnshire Community and Mental Health Services National Health Service Trust (Establishment) Amendment Order 1997 (S.I. 1997/1186)
 Deregulation (Public Health Acts Amendment Act 1907) Order 1997 (S.I. 1997/1187)
 County Council of the Royal County of Berkshire A329(M) Special Road Variation Scheme 1996 Confirmation Instrument 1997 (S.I. 1997/1188)
 Act of Sederunt (Legal Aid Rules) (Children) (Amendment) 1997 (S.I. 1997/1194)

1201-1300
 A41 Trunk Road (Barnet) Red Route (No. 2) Traffic Order 1997 (S.I. 1997/1210)
 A23 Trunk Road (Croydon) Red Route Traffic Order 1997 (S.I. 1997/1211)
 Offshore Installations (Safety Zones) (No. 2) Order 1997 (S.I. 1997/1220)
 A41 Trunk Road (Baker Street, Westminster) Red Route (Prohibited Turn) Traffic Order 1997 (S.I. 1997/1222)
 A406 Trunk Road (Brent) Red Route Traffic Order 1997 (S.I. 1997/1223)
 A406 Trunk Road (Brent) Red Route (Prohibited Turn) Traffic Order 1997 (S.I. 1997/1224)
 Glan Hafren National Health Service Trust (Establishment) Amendment Order 1997 (S.I. 1997/1225)
 A46 Trunk Road (Newark To Lincoln Improvement) (Brough Bypass) (Detrunking) Order 1997 (S.I. 1997/1236)
 A46 Trunk Road (Newark to Lincoln Improvement) (Brough Bypass) Order 1997 (S.I. 1997/1237)
 A41 Trunk Road (Barnet) Red Route Traffic Order 1997 Variation Order 1997 (S.I. 1997/1257)
 Act of Sedurant (Rules of the Court of Session Amendment No. 5) (Transcripts of Evidence and Attendance Fees for Shorthand Writers etc.) 1997 (S.I. 1997/1260)
 Act of Sedurant (Fees of Shorthand Writers in the Sheriff Court) (Amendment No. 2) 1997 (S.I. 1997/1265)
 Greater Manchester (Light Rapid Transit System) (Airport Extension) Order 1997 (S.I. 1997/1266)
 European Parliamentary (United Kingdom Representatives) Pensions (Amendment) Order 1997 (S.I. 1997/1291)
 M6 Birmingham to Carlisle Motorway (At Haighton) Connecting Roads Scheme 1997 (S.I. 1997/1292)
 M6 Birmingham To Carlisle Motorway (at Haighton) Special Roads Scheme 1997 Transfer Order 1997 (S.I. 1997/1293)

1301-1400
 Finance Act 1997, Schedule 6, Paragraph 7, (Appointed Day) Order 1997 (S.I. 1997/1305)
 Southern Sea Fisheries District (Constitution of Committee and Expenses) (Variation) Order 1997 (S.I. 1997/1306)
 Building Societies Act 1997 (Commencement No. 1) Order 1997 (S.I. 1997/1307)
 Wiltshire Health Authority (Transfers of Trust Property) Order 1997 (S.I. 1997/1308)
 Companies Overseas Branch Registers (Hong Kong) Order 1997 (S.I. 1997/1313)
 Consular Fees Order 1997 (S.I. 1997/1314)
 Medical (Professional Performance) Act 1995 (Commencement No. 3) Order 1997 (S.I. 1997/1315)
 Criminal Justice Act 1988 (Designated Countries and Territories) (Amendment) Order 1997 (S.I. 1997/1316)
 Criminal Justice (International Co-operation) Act 1990 (Enforcement of Overseas Forfeiture Orders) (Amendment) Order 1997 (S.I. 1997/1317)
 Drug Trafficking Act 1994 (Designated Countries and Territories) (Amendment) Order 1997 (S.I. 1997/1318)
 European Convention on Cinematographic Co-production (Amendment) (No. 2) Order 1997 (S.I. 1997/1319)
 Merchant Shipping (Safe Manning, Hours of Work and Watchkeeping) Regulations 1997 (S.I. 1997/1320 (See also S.I. 1997/1911))
 Flood Prevention and Land Drainage (Scotland) Act 1997 (Commencement) Order 1997 (S.I. 1997/1322)
 Leicestershire Ambulance and Paramedic Service National Health Service Trust (Establishment) Amendment Order 1997 (S.I. 1997/1325)
 Gloucestershire Health Authority (Transfers of Trust Property) Order 1997 (S.I. 1997/1326)
 British Nationality (Fees) (Amendment) Regulations 1997 (S.I. 1997/1328)
 Stock Transfer (Gilt-Edged Securities) (CGO Service) (Amendment) Regulations 1997 (S.I. 1997/1329)
 A501 Trunk Road (Euston Road, Camden and Westminster) Red Route (Prescribed Route and Prohibited Turn) Traffic Order 1997 (S.I. 1997/1330)
 Surface Waters (Fishlife) (Classification) Regulations 1997 (S.I. 1997/1331)
 Surface Waters (Shellfish) (Classification) Regulations 1997 (S.I. 1997/1332)
 Listed Events (Prescribed Multiplier) Order 1997 (S.I. 1997/1333)
 Hong Kong Economic and Trade Office (Exemptions and Reliefs) Order 1997 (S.I. 1997/1334)
 Novel Foods and Novel Food Ingredients Regulations 1997 (S.I. 1997/1335)
 Novel Foods and Novel Food Ingredients (Fees) Regulations 1997 (S.I. 1997/1336)
 Home-Grown Cereals Authority (Rate of Levy) Order 1997 (S.I. 1997/1337)
 Road Vehicles (Construction and Use) (Amendment) (No. 3) Regulations 1997 (S.I. 1997/1340)
 Merchant Shipping (Mandatory Ships' Routeing) Regulations 1997 (S.I. 1997/1341)
 Road Traffic (Special Parking Area) (London Borough of Croydon) Order 1997 (S.I. 1997/1342)
 Medicines (Registered Homeopathic Veterinary Medicinal Products) (General Sale List) Order 1997 (S.I. 1997/1349)
 Medicines (Pharmacy and General Sale — Exemption) (Amendment) Order 1997 (S.I. 1997/1350)
 BBC World Service Transfer Scheme (Capital Allowances) Order 1997 (S.I. 1997/1354)
 Anglian Regional Flood Defence Committee Order 1997 (S.I. 1997/1359)
 Northumbria Regional Flood Defence Committee Order 1997 (S.I. 1997/1360)
 Severn-Trent Regional Flood Defence Committee Order 1997 (S.I. 1997/1361)
 Southern Regional Flood Defence Committee Order 1997 (S.I. 1997/1362)
 Thames Regional Flood Defence Committee Order 1997 (S.I. 1997/1363)
 Wessex Regional Flood Defence Committee Order 1997 (S.I. 1997/1364)
 Motor Vehicles (Type Approval for Goods Vehicles) (Great Britain) (Amendment) Regulations 1997 (S.I. 1997/1365)
 Motor Vehicles (Approval) (Amendment) Regulations 1997 (S.I. 1997/1366)
 Motor Vehicles (Type Approval) (Great Britain) (Amendment) Regulations 1997 (S.I. 1997/1367)
 Education (Individual Pupils' Achievements) (Information) Regulations 1997 (S.I. 1997/1368)
 Road Traffic (Special Parking Area) (City of Westminster) (Amendment) Order 1997 (S.I. 1997/1369)
 Social Security Act 1990 (Commencement No.6) Order 1997 (S.I. 1997/1370)
 Control of Trade in Endangered Species (Enforcement) Regulations 1997 (S.I. 1997/1372)
 Local Government Superannuation (Scotland) Amendment (No. 2) Regulations 1997 (S.I. 1997/1373)
 Solihull Healthcare National Health Service Trust (Transfer of Trust Property) Order 1997 (S.I. 1997/1375)
 Horizon National Health Service Trust (Establishment) Amendment Order 1997 (S.I. 1997/1376)
 Police Act 1997 (Commencement No. 1 and Transitional Provisions) Order 1997 (S.I. 1997/1377)
 Atomic Weapons Establishment Act 1991 Amendment Order 1997 (S.I. 1997/1396)
 Education (Funding for Teacher Training) Designation (No. 2) Order 1997 (S.I. 1997/1399)
 West Yorkshire Metropolitan Ambulance Service National Health Service Trust (Establishment) Amendment Order 1997 (S.I. 1997/1400)

1401-1500
 Portsmouth Health Care National Health Service Trust (Transfer of Trust Property) Order 1997 (S.I. 1997/1401)
 Immigration (Exemption from Control) (Amendment) Order 1997 (S.I. 1997/1402)
 Northern Ireland (Emergency Provisions) Act 1996 (Amendment) Order 1997 (S.I. 1997/1403)
 Register of Occupational and Personal Pension Schemes (Amendment) Regulations 1997 (S.I. 1997/1405)
 Northern Ireland (Entry to Negotiations, etc.) Act 1996 (Revival of Section 3) Order 1997 (S.I. 1997/1410)
 Antarctic Act 1994 (Commencement) Order 1997 (S.I. 1997/1411)
 Miscellaneous Food Additives (Amendment) Regulations 1997 (S.I. 1997/1413)
 Eggs (Marketing Standards) (Amendment) Regulations 1997 (S.I. 1997/1414)
 Seeds (Fees) (Amendment) Regulations 1997 (S.I. 1997/1415)
 Protection from Harassment Act 1997 (Commencement) (No. 1) Order 1997 (S.I. 1997/1418)
 Local Government Act 1988 (Defined Activities) (Exemption) (Dacorum Borough Council) Order 1997 (S.I. 1997/1420)
 Control of Trade in Endangered Species (Fees) Regulations 1997 (S.I. 1997/1421)
 Building Societies Act 1997 (Commencement No. 2) Order 1997 (S.I. 1997/1427)
 Hydrographic Office Trading Fund (Variation) Order 1997 (S.I. 1997/1428)
 Police Pensions (Amendment) Regulations 1997 (S.I. 1997/1429)
 Transfer of Crofting Estates (Scotland) Act 1997 Commencement Order 1997 (S.I. 1997/1430)
 Distress for Customs and Excise Duties and Other Indirect Taxes Regulations 1997 (S.I. 1997/1431)
 Finance Act 1997, sections 52 and 53, (Appointed Day) Order 1997 (S.I. 1997/1432)
 Finance Act 1997 (Repeal of Distress and Diligence enactments) (Appointed Day) Order 1997 (S.I. 1997/1433)
 National Health Service Superannuation Scheme (Scotland) Amendment Regulations 1997 (S.I. 1997/1434)
 Local Government Superannuation (Scotland) Amendment (No. 3) Regulations 1997 (S.I. 1997/1435)
 Local Government Act 1988 (Competition) (Scotland) Amendment Regulations 1997 (S.I. 1997/1436)
 Fire Services (Appointments and Promotion) (Scotland) Amendment Regulations 1997 (S.I. 1997/1437)
 Local Government (Exemption from Competition) (Scotland) Amendment Order 1997 (S.I. 1997/1438)
 Local Government, Planning and Land Act 1980 (Competition) (Scotland) Amendment Regulations 1997 (S.I. 1997/1439)
 Environmentally Sensitive Areas (The Broads) Designation Order 1997 (S.I. 1997/1440)
 Environmentally Sensitive Areas (Pennine Dales) Designation Order 1997 (S.I. 1997/1441)
 Environmentally Sensitive Areas (Somerset Levels and Moors) Designation Order 1997 (S.I. 1997/1442)
 Environmentally Sensitive Areas (South Downs) Designation Order 1997 (S.I. 1997/1443)
 Environmentally Sensitive Areas (West Penwith) Designation Order 1997 (S.I. 1997/1444)
 Environmentally Sensitive Areas (Breckland) Designation (Amendment) Order 1997 (S.I. 1997/1445)
 Environmentally Sensitive Areas (Clun) Designation (Amendment) Order 1997 (S.I. 1997/1446)
 Environmentally Sensitive Areas (North Peak) Designation (Amendment) Order 1997 (S.I. 1997/1447)
 Environmentally Sensitive Areas (Suffolk River Valleys) Designation (Amendment) Order 1997 (S.I. 1997/1448)
 Environmentally Sensitive Areas (Test Valley) Designation (Amendment) Order 1997 (S.I. 1997/1449)
 Environmentally Sensitive Areas (Avon Valley) Designation (Amendment) Order 1997 (S.I. 1997/1450)
 Environmentally Sensitive Areas (Exmoor) Designation (Amendment) Order 1997 (S.I. 1997/1451)
 Environmentally Sensitive Areas (Lake District) Designation (Amendment) Order 1997 (S.I. 1997/1452)
 Environmentally Sensitive Areas (North Kent Marshes) Designation (Amendment) Order 1997 (S.I. 1997/1453)
 Environmentally Sensitive Areas (South Wessex Downs) Designation (Amendment) Order 1997 (S.I. 1997/1454)
 Environmentally Sensitive Areas (South West Peak) Designation (Amendment) Order 1997 (S.I. 1997/1455)
 Environmentally Sensitive Areas (England) Designation Orders (Revocation of Specified Provisions) Regulations 1997 (S.I. 1997/1456)
 Agriculture Act 1986 (Amendment) Regulations 1997 (S.I. 1997/1457)
 Road Vehicles (Construction and Use) (Amendment) (No. 4) Regulations 1997 (S.I. 1997/1458)
 Motor Vehicles (Approval) (Fees) Regulations 1997 (S.I. 1997/1459)
 Chemicals (Hazard Information and Packaging for Supply) (Amendment) Regulations 1997 (S.I. 1997/1460)
 Education Act 1997 (Commencement No. 2 and Transitional Provisions) Order 1997 (S.I. 1997/1468)
 Registration of Overseas Births and Deaths (Amendment) Regulations 1997 (S.I. 1997/1466)
 Medicines (Products for Animal Use — Fees) Regulations 1997 (S.I. 1997/1469)
 Lerwick Harbour Revision Order 1997 (S.I. 1997/1472)
 National Health Service (General Medical Services) (Scotland) Amendment (No. 2) Regulations 1997 (S.I. 1997/1473)
 Seed Potatoes (Amendment) Regulations 1997 (S.I. 1997/1474)
 Welfare of Animals (Transport) Order 1997 (S.I. 1997/1480)
 Food Protection (Emergency Prohibitions) (Oil and Chemical Pollution of Fish and Plants) (Partial Revocation No. 2) Order 1997 (S.I. 1997/1481)
 Leicestershire Ambulance and Paramedic Service National Health Service Trust (Establishment) Amendment (No. 2) Order 1997 (S.I. 1997/1482)
 Horizon National Health Service Trust (Establishment) Amendment (No. 2) Order 1997 (S.I. 1997/1483)
 Legal Aid in Criminal and Care Proceedings (Costs) (Amendment) (No. 3) Regulations 1997 (S.I. 1997/1484)
 Legal Aid in Criminal and Care Proceedings (General) (Amendment) (No. 2) Regulations 1997 (S.I. 1997/1485)
 Education (Individual Performance Information) (Identification of Individual Pupils) Regulations 1997 (S.I. 1997/1489)
 Protection from Harassment Act 1997 (Commencement) (No. 2) Order 1997 (S.I. 1997/1498)
 Contaminants in Food Regulations 1997 (S.I. 1997/1499)
 Solicitor General's Salary Order 1997 (S.I. 1997/1500)

1501-1600
 Motor Vehicles (EC Type Approval) (Amendment) (No. 2) Regulations 1997 (S.I. 1997/1501)
 Motor Vehicles (Type Approval) (Great Britain) (Amendment) (No. 2) Regulations 1997 (S.I. 1997/1502)
 A312 Trunk Road (The Parkway, Hounslow) Red Route (Prescribed Route) Traffic Order 1997 (S.I. 1997/1503)
 Criminal Procedure and Investigations Act 1996 (Appointed Day No. 5) Order 1997 (S.I. 1997/1504)
 Road Works (Registers, Notices, Directions and Designations) (Scotland) Amendment Regulations 1997 (S.I. 1997/1505)
 A4 Trunk Road (Hillingdon and Hounslow) Red Route Traffic Order 1997 (S.I. 1997/1507)
 Merchant Shipping (Crew Accommodation) Regulations 1997 (S.I. 1997/1508)
 Merchant Shipping (Cargo Ship Construction) Regulations 1997 (S.I. 1997/1509)
 Merchant Shipping (Tonnage) Regulations 1997 (S.I. 1997/1510)
 Merchant Shipping (Official Log Books for Merchant Ships and Fishing Vessels) (Amendment) Regulations 1997 (S.I. 1997/1511)
 A406 Trunk Road (Barnet) Red Route (Clearway) Traffic Order 1996 Variation Order 1997 (S.I. 1997/1513)
 A41 Trunk Road (Camden) Red Route Experimental (No.2) Traffic Order 1997 Variation Order 1997 (S.I. 1997/1514)
 A406 Trunk Road (Hanger Lane, Ealing) Red Route (Prohibited Turns) Experimental Traffic Order 1997 (S.I. 1997/1515)
 Value Added Tax (Reverse Charge) (Anti-avoidance) Order 1997 (S.I. 1997/1523)
 Value Added Tax (Place of Supply of Services) (Amendment) Order 1997 (S.I. 1997/1524)
 Value Added Tax (Amendment) (No. 2) Regulations 1997 (S.I. 1997/1525)
 Act of Adjournal (Criminal Procedure Rules Amendment No.2) (Non-harassment order) 1997 (S.I. 1997/1526)
 Act of Sederunt (Rules of the Court of Session Amendment No.6 ) (Actions of harassment) 1997 (S.I. 1997/1527)
 Protection of Wrecks (Designation) Order 1997 (S.I. 1997/1528)
 General Medical Council (Professional Performance) Rules Order of Council 1997 (S.I. 1997/1529)
 Unichem Limited (Allotment of Shares) Revocation S.I. 1997/1530)
 Railways (Heathrow Express Temporary Network) (Exemptions) Order 1997 (S.I. 1997/1531)
 North Yorkshire (Coroners' Districts) Order 1997 (S.I. 1997/1532)
 Registration of Births and Deaths (Amendment No. 2) Regulations 1997 (S.I. 1997/1533)
 Land Registration (District Registries) Order 1997 (S.I. 1997/1534)
 Firearms (Amendment) Act 1997 (Commencement) (No. 2) Order 1997 (S.I. 1997/1535)
 Firearms (Amendment) Act 1997 (Commencement) (No. 2) (Amendment) Order 1997 (S.I. 1997/1536)
 Firearms (Amendment) Act 1997 (Firearms of Historic Interest) Order 1997 (S.I. 1997/1537)
 Firearms (Amendment) Act 1997 (Transitional Provisions and Savings) Regulations 1997 (S.I. 1997/1538)
 Merchant Shipping and Maritime Security Act 1997 (Commencement No. 2) Order 1997 (S.I. 1997/1539)
 Fertilisers (Amendment) Regulations 1997 (S.I. 1997/1543)
 Road Vehicles (Construction and Use) (Amendment) (No. 5) Regulations 1997 (S.I. 1997/1544)
 A21 Trunk Road (Morleys Interchange Slip Roads) (Trunking) Order 1997 (S.I. 1997/1545)
 Food Protection (Emergency Prohibitions) (Paralytic Shellfish Poisoning) Order 1997 (S.I. 1997/1565)
 Hong Kong (Colonial Probates Act) Order 1997 (S.I. 1997/1572)
 Potato Marketing Board (Residuary Functions) Regulations 1997 (S.I. 1997/1573)
 Public Lending Right Scheme 1982 (Commencement of Variations) Order 1997 (S.I. 1997/1576)
 Social Security Administration (Fraud) Act 1997 (Commencement No. 1) Order 1997 (S.I. 1997/1577)
 Bermuda (Territorial Sea) (Amendment) Order 1997 (S.I. 1997/1578)
 Transfer of Prisoners (Isle of Man) - Order 1997 (S.I. 1997/1579)
 Road Traffic Act 1991 (Commencement No.13) (Scotland) Order 1997 (S.I. 1997/1580)
 Crime (Sentences) Act 1997 (Commencement) (No. 1) Order 1997 (S.I. 1997/1581)
 Water (Prevention of Pollution) (Code of Practice) (Scotland) Order 1997 (S.I. 1997/1584)
 Police Act 1997 (Provisions in relation to the NCIS Service Authority) (No. 1) Order 1997 (S.I. 1997/1585)
 British Coal Corporation (Change of Quorum) Regulations 1997 (S.I. 1997/1588)

1601-1700
 Finance Act 1997, Section 110, (Appointed Day) Order 1997 (S.I. 1997/1603)
 Horserace Betting Levy (Bookmakers' Committee) Regulations 1997 (S.I. 1997/1604)
 A41 Trunk Road (Camden) Red Route Experimental (No. 2) Traffic Order 1997 Variation (No. 2) Order 1997 (S.I. 1997/1607)
 A406 Trunk Road (Barnet) Red Route Traffic Order 1997 (S.I. 1997/1608)
 International Monetary Fund (Limit on Lending) Order 1997 (S.I. 1997/1611)
 Local Government Pension Scheme Regulations 1997 (S.I. 1997/1612)
 Local Government Pension Scheme (Transitional Provisions) Regulations 1997 (S.I. 1997/1613)
 Value Added Tax (Amendment) (No.3) Regulations 1997 (S.I. 1997/1614)
 Value Added Tax (Cars) (Amendment) Order 1997 (S.I. 1997/1615)
 Value Added Tax (Special Provisions) (Amendment) Order 1997 (S.I. 1997/1616)
 Avon Health Authority (Transfers of Trust Property) Order 1997 (S.I. 1997/1618)
 North and East Devon Health Authority (Transfer of Trust Property) Order 1997 (S.I. 1997/1619)
 Worcestershire Community Healthcare National Health Service Trust (Transfer of Trust Property) Order 1997 (S.I. 1997/1620)
 Housing (Change of Landlord) (Payment of Disposal Cost by Instalments) (Amendment) (No. 2) Regulations 1997 (S.I. 1997/1621)
 Education Act 1996 (Commencement No. 2 and Appointed Day) Order 1997 (S.I. 1997/1623)
 Energy Information (Combined Washer-driers) Regulations 1997 (S.I. 1997/1624)
 Education (Disability Statements for Local Education Authorities) (England) Regulations 1997 (S.I. 1997/1625)
 Environment Act 1995 (Commencement No. 9 and Transitional Provisions) Order 1997 (S.I. 1997/1626)
 Insurance Premium Tax (Taxable Insurance Contracts) Order 1997 (S.I. 1997/1627)
 Value Added Tax (Increase of Registration Limits) Order 1997 (S.I. 1997/1628)
 Third Country Fishing (Enforcement) (Amendment) Order 1997 (S.I. 1997/1629)
 Fishing Boats (Specified Countries) Designation (Variation) Order 1997 (S.I. 1997/1630)
 Local Authorities Etc. (Allowances) (Scotland) Amendment Regulations 1997 (S.I. 1997/1631)
 A12 Trunk Road (Redbridge) Red Route Traffic Order 1996 Variation Order 1997 (S.I. 1997/1632)
 Education (School Performance Information) (Wales) Regulations 1997 (S.I. 1997/1633)
 Grants for School Education (Early Intervention and Alternatives to Exclusion) (Scotland) Regulations 1997 (S.I. 1997/1638)
 Royal Parks and Other Open Spaces Regulations 1997 (S.I. 1997/1639)
 St Mary's Music School (Aided Places) Amendment Regulations 1997 (S.I. 1997/1640)
 Education (Assisted Places) (Scotland) Amendment Regulations 1997 (S.I. 1997/1641)
 Contracting Out (Functions in relation to the provision of Guardians Ad Litem and Reporting Officers Panels) Order 1997 (S.I. 1997/1652)
 Civil Aviation (Route Charges for Navigation Services) (Third Amendment) Regulations 1997 (S.I. 1997/1653)
 Recreation Grounds (Revocation of Parish Council Byelaws) Order 1997 (S.I. 1997/1654)
 Offshore Installations (Safety Zones) (No. 3) Order 1997 (S.I. 1997/1655)
 Guardians Ad Litem and Reporting Officers (Panels) (Amendment) Regulations 1997 (S.I. 1997/1662)
 Local Government Act 1988 (Defined Activities) (Exemption) (Craven, Kerrier and Mid-Devon District Councils and Middlesbrough Borough Council) Order 1997 (S.I. 1997/1666)
 Social Security (Miscellaneous Amendments) (No. 3) Regulations 1997 (S.I. 1997/1671)
 Architects Act 1997 (Commencement) Order 1997 (S.I. 1997/1672)
 International Carriage of Perishable Foodstuffs (Amendment) Regulations 1997 (S.I. 1997/1673)
 Merchant Shipping (Compensation to Seamen — War Damage to Effects) (Revocation) Scheme 1997 (S.I. 1997/1674)
 Education (Student Loans) Regulations 1997 (S.I. 1997/1675)
 Safety of Sports Grounds (Designation) Order 1997 (S.I. 1997/1676)
 Football Spectators (Seating) Order 1997 (S.I. 1997/1677)
 National Health Service (Fund-holding Practices) Amendment (No. 2) Regulations 1997 (S.I. 1997/1678)
 Motor Vehicles (Tests) (Amendment) (No.2) Regulations 1997 (S.I. 1997/1679)
 Registration of Births, Deaths, Marriages and Divorces (Fees) (Scotland) Amendment Regulations 1997 (S.I. 1997/1680)
 Taxes (Interest Rate) (Amendment) Regulations 1997 (S.I. 1997/1681)
 Satellite Television Service Regulations 1997 (S.I. 1997/1682)
 Judicial Pensions (Miscellaneous) (Amendment) Regulations 1997 (S.I. 1997/1687)
 Golden Valley Railway Order 1997 (S.I. 1997/1688)
 Northern Ireland Act 1974 (Interim Period Extension) Order 1997 (S.I. 1997/1690)
 Pneumoconiosis etc. (Workers' Compensation) (Payment of Claims) Amendment Regulations 1997 (S.I. 1997/1691)
 Firearms (Museums) Order 1997 (S.I. 1997/1692)
 Education (Mandatory Awards) (Amendment) Regulations 1997 (S.I. 1997/1693)
 Dual-Use and Related Goods (Export Control) (Amendment No. 3) Regulations 1997 (S.I. 1997/1694)
 Noise Act 1996 (Commencement No. 2) Order 1997 (S.I. 1997/1695)
 Police Act 1997 (Commencement No. 2) Order 1997 (S.I. 1997/1696)
 Local Authorities (Direct Labour Organisations) (Competition) (Wales) (Amendment) Regulations 1997 (S.I. 1997/1697)
 Local Government Act 1988 (Defined Activities) (Exemptions) (Wales) (Amendment) Order 1997 (S.I. 1997/1698)
 Local Government Act 1988 (Competition) (Wales) Regulations 1997 (S.I. 1997/1699)
 Local Government Act 1988 (Defined Activities) (Works Contracts) (Exemptions) (Wales) Order 1997 (S.I. 1997/1700)

1701-1800
 Local Government Act 1988 (Defined Activities) (Housing Management) (Exemptions) (Wales) (Amendment) Order 1997 (S.I. 1997/1701)
 Local Government Act 1988 (Direct Service Organisations) (Accounts etc.) (Extension) (Wales) (Amendment) Order 1997 (S.I. 1997/1702)
 Government Stock (Amendment) Regulations 1997 (S.I. 1997/1709)
 Land Registration Fees (No. 2) Order 1997 (S.I. 1997/1710)
 Charities (The Peabody Donation Fund) Order 1997 (S.I. 1997/1711)
 Crime and Punishment (Scotland) Act 1997 (Commencement and Transitional Provisions) Order 1997 (S.I. 1997/1712)
 Confined Spaces Regulations 1997 (S.I. 1997/1713)
 Betting and Gaming Duties Act 1981 (Bingo Prize Limit) Order 1997 (S.I. 1997/1714)
 Open-ended Investment Companies (Tax) (Amendment) Regulations 1997 (S.I. 1997/1715)
 Personal Equity Plan (Amendment No. 2) Regulations 1997 (S.I. 1997/1716)
 Protection of Wrecks (Designation No. 2) Order 1997 (S.I. 1997/1717)
 Protection of Wrecks (Designation No. 3) Order 1997 (S.I. 1997/1718)
 Return of Cultural Objects (Amendment) Regulations 1997 (S.I. 1997/1719)
 Act of Sederunt (Rules of the Court of Session Amendment No. 7) (Judicial Factors) 1997 (S.I. 1997/1720)
 Liquor Licensing (Fees) (Scotland) Order 1997 (S.I. 1997/1721)
 Nurses, Midwives and Health Visitors (Supervisors of Midwives) Amendment Rules Approval Order 1997 (S.I. 1997/1723)
 James Paget Hospital National Health Service Trust (Change of Name) Order 1997 (S.I. 1997/1724)
 Confiscation of Alcohol (Young Persons) Act 1997 (Commencement) Order 1997 (S.I. 1997/1725)
 Council Tax Limitation (England) (Maximum Amounts) Order 1997 (S.I. 1997/1726)
 Medicines (Stilbenes and Thyrostatic Substances Prohibition) (Revocation) Order 1997 (S.I. 1997/1727)
 Medicines (Control of Substances for Manufacture) (Revocation) Order 1997 (S.I. 1997/1728)
 Animals and Animal Products (Examination for Residues and Maximum Residue Limits) Regulations 1997 (S.I. 1997/1729)
 Legal Advice and Assistance (Scope) (Amendment) (No. 2) Regulations 1997 (S.I. 1997/1731)
 Contracting Out (Metropolitan Police and Civil Staffs Pensions) Order 1997 (S.I. 1997/1736)
 London Docklands Development Corporation (Alteration of Boundaries) Order 1997 (S.I. 1997/1738)
 Food Protection (Emergency Prohibitions) (Paralytic Shellfish Poisoning) Order 1997 Partial Revocation Order 1997 (S.I. 1997/1739)
 Supply of Beer (Tied Estate) (Amendment) Order 1997 (S.I. 1997/1740)
 Homelessness (Suitability of Accommodation) (Amendment) Order 1997 (S.I. 1997/1741)
 European Communities (Designation) (No. 2) Order 1997 (S.I. 1997/1742)
 European Convention on Cinematographic Co-production (Amendment) (No. 3) Order 1997 (S.I. 1997/1743)
 Secretary of State for Culture, Media and Sport Order 1997 (S.I. 1997/1744)
 Army, Air Force and Naval Discipline Acts (Continuation) Order 1997 (S.I. 1997/1745)
 Air Navigation (Overseas Territories) (Amendment) Order 1997 (S.I. 1997/1746)
 Child Abduction and Custody (Parties to Conventions) (Amendment) Order 1997 (S.I. 1997/1747)
 Environment Protection (Overseas Territories) (Amendment) Order 1997 (S.I. 1997/1748)
 Transfer of Functions (International Development) Order 1997 (S.I. 1997/1749)
 Fishery Limits Order 1997 (S.I. 1997/1750)
 United Nations (International Tribunal) (Rwanda) (Amendment) Order 1997 (S.I. 1997/1751)
 United Nations (International Tribunal) (Former Yugoslavia) (Amendment) Order 1997 (S.I. 1997/1752)
 United Nations (International Tribunals) (Former Yugoslavia and Rwanda) (Dependent Territories) Order 1997 (S.I. 1997/1753)
 Appropriation (No. 2) (Northern Ireland) Order 1997 (S.I. 1997/1754)
 Broadcasting Act 1996 (British Broadcasting Corporation — Transmission Network) (Guernsey) Order 1997 (S.I. 1997/1755)
 Broadcasting Act 1996 (British Broadcasting Corporation — Transmission Network) (Isle of Man) Order 1997 (S.I. 1997/1756)
 Broadcasting Act 1996 (British Broadcasting Corporation-Transmission Network) (Jersey) Order 1997 (S.I. 1997/1757)
 Commissioner for Complaints (Amendment) (Northern Ireland) Order 1997 (S.I. 1997/1758)
 European Convention on Extradition Order 1990 (Amendment) Order 1997 (S.I. 1997/1759)
 Extradition (Aviation Security) Order 1997 (S.I. 1997/1760)
 Extradition (Designated Commonwealth Countries) Order 1991 (Amendment) Order 1997 (S.I. 1997/1761)
 Extradition (Drug Trafficking) Order 1997 (S.I. 1997/1762)
 Extradition (Hijacking) Order 1997 (S.I. 1997/1763)
 Extradition (Internationally Protected Persons) Order 1997 (S.I. 1997/1764)
 Extradition (Protection of Nuclear Material) Order 1997 (S.I. 1997/1765)
 Extradition (Safety of Maritime Navigation) Order 1997 (S.I. 1997/1766)
 Extradition (Taking of Hostages) Order 1997 (S.I. 1997/1767)
 Extradition (Tokyo Convention) Order 1997  S.I. 1997/1768)
 Extradition (Torture) Order 1997 (S.I. 1997/1769)
 Food and Environment Protection Act 1985 (Guernsey) (Amendment) Order 1997 (S.I. 1997/1770)
 Food and Environment Protection Act 1985 (Jersey) (Amendment) Order 1997 (S.I. 1997/1771)
 Further Education (Northern Ireland) Order 1997 (S.I. 1997/1772)
 Merchant Shipping (Salvage Convention) (Jersey) Order 1997 (S.I. 1997/1773)
 Police (Health and Safety) (Northern Ireland) Order 1997 (S.I. 1997/1774)
 Transfer of Prisoners (Isle of Man) (No. 2) Order 1997 (S.I. 1997/1775)
 Transfer of Prisoners (Restricted Transfers) (Channel Islands and Isle of Man) Order 1997 (S.I. 1997/1776)
 Double Taxation Relief (Taxes on Income) (Argentina) Order 1997 (S.I. 1997/1777)
 Social Security (United States of America) Order 1997 (S.I. 1997/1778)
 Visiting Forces (Designation) Order 1997 (S.I. 1997/1779)
 National Health Service (Primary Care) Act 1997 (Commencement No. 1) Order 1997 (S.I. 1997/1780)
 Valuation Timetable (Scotland) Amendment Order 1997 (S.I. 1997/1781)
 Registration of Births, Still-Births and Deaths (Prescription of Errors) (Scotland) Regulations 1997 (S.I. 1997/1782)
 Lotteries (Gaming Board Fees) Order 1997 (S.I. 1997/1783)
 Sports Grounds and Sporting Events (Designation) (Scotland) Amendment Order 1997 (S.I. 1997/1787)
 Act of Adjournal (Criminal Procedure Rules Amendment No. 3) 1997 (S.I. 1997/1788)
 Education (School Teachers' Pay and Conditions) (No. 2) Order 1997 (S.I. 1997/1789)
 Social Security (Lone Parents) (Amendment) Regulations 1997 (S.I. 1997/1790)
 Birmingham Health Authority (Transfers of Trust Property) Order 1997 (S.I. 1997/1791)

1801-1900
 Oil Pollution (Compulsory Insurance) Regulations 1997 (S.I. 1997/1820)
 National Health Service (Pilot Schemes: Financial Assistance for Preparatory Work) Regulations 1997 (S.I. 1997/1821)
 A316 Trunk Road (Richmond) Red Route Traffic Order 1997 (S.I. 1997/1824)
 Countryside Stewardship (Amendment)Regulations 1997 (S.I. 1997/1827)
 Gaming Act (Variation of Monetary Limits) Order 1997 (S.I. 1997/1828)
 Firemen's Pensions (Provision of Information) Regulations 1997 (S.I. 1997/1829)
 Prescription Only Medicines (Human Use) Order 1997 (S.I. 1997/1830)
 Medicines (Sale or Supply) (Miscellaneous Provisions) Amendment Regulations 1997 (S.I. 1997/1831)
 Education (School Information) (Wales) Regulations 1997 (S.I. 1997/1832)
 Education (School Inspection) (Wales) (No. 2) (Amendment) Regulations 1997 (S.I. 1997/1833)
 Act of Adjournal (Criminal Procedure Rules Amendment No. 4) 1997 (S.I. 1997/1834)
 Local Authorities (Goods and Services) (Public Bodies) (English Heritage) Order 1997 (S.I. 1997/1835)
 Value Added Tax (Terminal Markets) (Amendment) Order 1997 (S.I. 1997/1836)
 County Court (Amendment) Rules 1997 (S.I. 1997/1837)
 County Court (Forms) (Amendment) Rules 1997 (S.I. 1997/1838)
 Social Security (Attendance Allowance and Disability Living Allowance) (Miscellaneous Amendments) Regulations 1997 (S.I. 1997/1839)
 Fire Precautions (Workplace) Regulations 1997  S.I. 1997/1840)
 Council Tax Benefit (General) Amendment Regulations 1997 (S.I. 1997/1841)
 Wireless Telegraphy (Control of Interference from Videosenders) Order 1997 (S.I. 1997/1842 (This SI has been amended by S.I. 1998/722))
 West Mercia (Police Area and Authority) Order 1997 (S.I. 1997/1844)
 Cheshire (Police Area and Authority) Order 1997 (S.I. 1997/1845)
 Cambridgeshire (Police Area and Authority) Order 1997 (S.I. 1997/1846)
 Essex (Police Area and Authority) Order 1997 (S.I. 1997/1847)
 Thames Valley (Police Authority) Order 1997 (S.I. 1997/1848)
 Devon and Cornwall (Police Area and Authority) Order 1997 (S.I. 1997/1849)
 Nottinghamshire (Police Area and Authority) Order 1997 (S.I. 1997/1850)
 Housing Act 1996 (Commencement No. 11 and Savings) Order 1997 (S.I. 1997/1851)
 Leasehold Valuation Tribunals (Fees) Order 1997 (S.I. 1997/1852)
 Leasehold Valuation Tribunals (Service Charges, Insurance or Appointment of Managers Applications) Order 1997 (S.I. 1997/1853)
 Rent Assessment Committee (England and Wales) (Leasehold Valuation Tribunal) (Amendment) Regulations 1997 (S.I. 1997/1854)
 Lancashire (Police Area and Authority) Order 1997 (S.I. 1997/1855)
 Broadcasting (Technical Services) Order 1997 (S.I. 1997/1856)
 Kent (Police Area and Authority) Order 1997 (S.I. 1997/1857)
 Savings Contracts (Amendment) Regulations 1997 (S.I. 1997/1858)
 Savings Certificates (Amendment) Regulations 1997 (S.I. 1997/1859)
 Savings Certificates (Children's Bonus Bonds) (Amendment) Regulations 1997 (S.I. 1997/1860)
 General Medical Council (Legal Assessors) (Amendment) Rules 1997 (S.I. 1997/1861)
 Premium Savings Bonds (Amendment) Regulations 1997 (S.I. 1997/1862)
 Savings Certificates (Yearly Plan) (Amendment) Regulations 1997 (S.I. 1997/1863)
 National Savings Stock Register (Amendment) Regulations 1997 (S.I. 1997/1864)
 Banking Act 1987 (Exempt Transactions) (Amendment) Regulations 1997 (S.I. 1997/1866)
 Merchant Shipping (Prevention of Pollution: Substances Other than Oil) (Intervention) Order 1997 (S.I. 1997/1869)
 Environmental Assessment (Scotland) Amendment Regulations 1997 (S.I. 1997/1870)
 Town and Country Planning (General Permitted Development) (Scotland) Amendment Order 1997 (S.I. 1997/1871)
 Building Standards (Relaxation by Local Authorities) (Scotland) Regulations 1997 (S.I. 1997/1872)
 Corn Returns Regulations 1997 (S.I. 1997/1873)
 Fish Health Regulations 1997 (S.I. 1997/1881)
 General Medical Council (Registration (Fees) (Amendment) Regulations) Order of Council 1997 (S.I. 1997/1884)
 Wireless Telegraphy (Licence Charges) (Amendment No. 2) Regulations 1997 (S.I. 1997/1885)
 Telecommunications (Voice Telephony) Regulations 1997 (S.I. 1997/1886)
 Trading Schemes (Exclusion) (Amendment) Regulations 1997 (S.I. 1997/1887)
 National Health Service Pension Scheme (Amendment) Regulations 1997 (S.I. 1997/1888)
 Ecclesiastical Judges and Legal Officers(Fees) Order 1997 (S.I. 1997/1889)
 Legal Officers (Annual Fees) Order 1997 (S.I. 1997/1890)
 Parochial Fees Order 1997 (S.I. 1997/1891)
 Family Law Act 1996 (Commencement No. 2) Order 1997 (S.I. 1997/1892)
 Family Proceedings (Amendment No. 3) Rules 1997 (S.I. 1997/1893)
 Family Proceedings Courts (Matrimonial Proceedings etc.) (Amendment) Rules 1997 (S.I. 1997/1894)
 Family Proceedings Courts (Children Act 1989) (Amendment) Rules 1997 (S.I. 1997/1895)
 Family Law Act 1996 (Part IV) (Allocation of Proceedings) Order 1997 (S.I. 1997/1896)
 Children (Allocation of Proceedings) (Amendment) Order 1997 (S.I. 1997/1897)
 Family Law Act 1996 (Modifications of Enactments) Order 1997 (S.I. 1997/1898)
 Family Proceedings Fees (Amendment) (No. 3) Order 1997 (S.I. 1997/1899)
 Genetically Modified Organisms (Deliberate Release and Risk Assessment-Amendment) Regulations 1997 (S.I. 1997/1900)

1901-2000
 Cattle Identification (Enforcement) Regulations 1997 (S.I. 1997/1901)
 Allocation of Housing (Reasonable and Additional Preference) Regulations 1997 (S.I. 1997/1902)
 Housing (Prescribed Forms) (Amendment) (No. 2) Regulations 1997 (S.I. 1997/1903)
 Building Regulations (Amendment) Regulations 1997 (S.I. 1997/1904)
 Bovines and Bovine Products (Despatch Prohibition and Production Restriction) Regulations 1997 (S.I. 1997/1905)
 Knives Act 1997 (Commencement) (No. 1) Order 1997 (S.I. 1997/1906)
 Knives (Forfeited Property) Regulations 1997 (S.I. 1997/1907)
 Police (Property) Regulations 1997 (S.I. 1997/1908)
 Jobseeker's Allowance (Workskill Courses) Pilot (No. 2) Regulations 1997 (S.I. 1997/1909)
 Merchant Shipping (Prevention of Oil Pollution) (Amendment) Regulations 1997 (S.I. 1997/1910)
 Merchant Shipping (Training, Certification and Safe Manning) (Amendment) Regulations 1997 (S.I. 1997/1911)
 Police Pensions (Provision of Information) Regulations 1997 (S.I. 1997/1912)
 Local Government Act 1988 (Defined Activities) (Exemption) (Hackney and Southwark London Borough Councils and Liverpool City Council) Order 1997 (S.I. 1997/1913)
 Dartford-Thurrock Crossing Tolls Order 1997 (S.I. 1997/1914)
 Dartford-Thurrock Crossing (Amendment) Regulations 1997 (S.I. 1997/1915)
 National Health Service Superannuation Scheme (Scotland) Amendment (No.2) Regulations 1997 (S.I. 1997/1916)
 Sex Offenders Act 1997 (Commencement) Order 1997 (S.I. 1997/1920)
 Sex Offenders (Certificate of Caution) Order 1997 (S.I. 1997/1921)
 Fishing Vessels (Decommissioning) Scheme 1997 (S.I. 1997/1924)
 Church of England Pensions Regulations 1997 (S.I. 1997/1929)
 Police Act 1997 (Commencement No. 3 and Transitional Provisions) Order 1997 (S.I. 1997/1930)
 Education (National Curriculum) (Assessment Arrangements for the Core Subjects) (Key Stage 1) (England) (Amendment) Order 1997 (S.I. 1997/1931)
 Partnerships (Unrestricted Size) No. 12 Regulations 1997 (S.I. 1997/1937)
 Electronic Fingerprinting etc. Device Approval (Scotland) Order 1997 (S.I. 1997/1939)
 Local Government Act 1988 (Defined Activities) (Exemption) (Christchurch Borough Council) Order 1997 (S.I. 1997/1940)
 Energy Efficiency (Refrigerators and Freezers) Regulations 1997 (S.I. 1997/1941)
 Sea Fishing (Enforcement of Community Conservation Measures) Order 1997 (S.I. 1997/1949)
 Transport and Works (Guided Transport Modes) (Amendment) Order 1997 (S.I. 1997/1951)
 Inverness Harbour Revision Order 1997 (S.I. 1997/1952)
 Cromarty Firth Port Authority Harbour Revision Order 1997 (S.I. 1997/1953)
 Nursery Education (Amendment) Regulations 1997 (S.I. 1997/1954)
 Finance Act 1997, section 7(10), (Appointed Day) Order 1997 (S.I. 1997/1960)
 Plant Passport (Plant Health Fees) (England and Wales) (Amendment) Regulations 1997 (S.I. 1997/1961)
 Agricultural Holdings (Units of Production) Order 1997 (S.I. 1997/1962)
 National Board for Nursing, Midwifery and Health Visiting for England (Constitution and Administration) Amendment Order 1997 (S.I. 1997/1963)
 Land Registration (Matrimonial Home Rights) Rules 1997 (S.I. 1997/1964)
 Lands Tribunal (Amendment) Rules 1997 (S.I. 1997/1965)
 Education (School Inspection) Regulations 1997 (S.I. 1997/1966)
 Education (Grants) (Music, Ballet and Choir Schools) (Amendment) Regulations 1997 (S.I. 1997/1967)
 Education (Assisted Places) Regulations 1997 (S.I. 1997/1968)
 Education (Assisted Places) (Incidental Expenses) Regulations 1997 (S.I. 1997/1969)
 Education (School Leaving Date) Order 1997 (S.I. 1997/1970)
 Education (Fees and Awards) Regulations 1997 (S.I. 1997/1972)
 Housing Benefit (General) Amendment (No. 2) Regulations 1997 (S.I. 1997/1974)
 Housing Benefit (General) Amendment (No. 3) Regulations 1997 (S.I. 1997/1975)
 Protection of Wrecks (SS Castilian) Order 1997 (S.I. 1997/1976)
 Treasure Act 1996 (Commencement No. 2) Order 1997 (S.I. 1997/1977)
 Food Protection (Emergency Prohibitions) (Paralytic Shellfish Poisoning) Order 1997 Revocation Order 1997 (S.I. 1997/1978)
 Accounts Commission for Scotland (Financial Year) Order 1997 (S.I. 1997/1979)
 Local Authority Accounts (Scotland) Amendment Regulations 1997 (S.I. 1997/1980)
 Local Government (Publication of Performance Information) (Scotland) Order 1997 (S.I. 1997/1981)
 Rent Officers (Housing Benefit Functions) Order 1997 (S.I. 1997/1984)
 Legal Aid in Criminal and Care Proceedings (General) (Amendment) (No. 3) Regulations 1997 (S.I. 1997/1985)
 Veal (Marketing Payment) Regulations 1997 (S.I. 1997/1986)
 Anglian Harbours National Health Service Trust Dissolution Order 1997 (S.I. 1997/1987)
 A180 Trunk Road (A180/A1136 Junction Improvement Slip Roads) Order 1997 (S.I. 1997/1988)
 Education (London Residuary Body) (Suspense Account Properties) Order 1997 (S.I. 1997/1990)
 European Bank for Reconstruction and Development (Further Payments to Capital Stock) Order 1997 (S.I. 1997/1991)
 Local Government Changes for England (Lord-Lieutenants and Sheriffs) Order 1997 (S.I. 1997/1992)
 Offshore Electricity and Noise Regulations 1997 (S.I. 1997/1993)
 Rent Officers (Housing Benefit Functions) (Scotland) Order 1997 (S.I. 1997/1995)
 Wireless Telegraphy (Short Range Devices) (Exemption) (Amendment) Regulations 1997 (S.I. 1997/1996)

2001-2100
 Housing (Change of Landlord) (Payment of Disposal Cost by Instalments) (Amendment) (No. 3) Regulations 1997 (S.I. 1997/2001)
 A501 Trunk Road (Camden, Islington and Westminster) Red Route Traffic Order 1997 (S.I. 1997/2002)
 A406 Trunk Road (North Circular Road, Ealing) Red Route (Prescribed Routes and Turns) Traffic Order 1997 (S.I. 1997/2003)
 Nursery Education (Amendment) (No. 2) Regulations 1997 (S.I. 1997/2006)
 Prisons and Young Offenders Institutions (Scotland) Amendment Rules 1997 (S.I. 1997/2007)
 Education (Fees and Awards) (Scotland) Amendment Regulations 1997 (S.I. 1997/2008)
 Education (National Curriculum) (Assessment Arrangements for English, Welsh, Mathematics and Science) (Key Stage 2) (Wales) Order 1997 (S.I. 1997/2009)
 Education (National Curriculum) (Key Stage 3 Assessment Arrangements) (Wales) Order 1997 (S.I. 1997/2010)
 Education (National Curriculum) (Assessment Arrangements for English, Welsh, Mathematics and Science) (Key Stage 1) (Wales) Order 1997 (S.I. 1997/2011)
 A205 Trunk Road (Lewisham) Red Route (Cycle Lane) Experimental Traffic Order 1997 (S.I. 1997/2012)
 A406 Trunk Road (North Circular Road, Ealing) Red Route (Prescribed Turns) Traffic Order 1997 (S.I. 1997/2013)
 A205 Trunk Road (Lewisham) Red Route Experimental Traffic Order 1997 (S.I. 1997/2014)
 London North Circular Trunk Road (A406) (East of Finchley High Road, Barnet) (Prohibition Of Use Of Gap In Central Reserve) Order 1997 (S.I. 1997/2023)
 Stonehenge Regulations 1997 (S.I. 1997/2038)
 Lambeth Healthcare National Health Service Trust (Transfer of Trust Property) Order 1997 (S.I. 1997/2041)
 Processed Cereal-based Foods and Baby Foods for Infants and Young Children Regulations 1997 (S.I. 1997/2042)
 Medicines (Products Other Than Veterinary Drugs) (General Sale List) Amendment Order 1997 (S.I. 1997/2043)
 Prescription Only Medicines (Human Use) Amendment Order 1997 (S.I. 1997/2044)
 Medicines (Sale or Supply) (Miscellaneous Provisions) Amendment (No. 2) Regulations 1997 (S.I. 1997/2045)
 Allocation of Housing and Homelessness (Amendment) (No. 2) Regulations 1997 (S.I. 1997/2046)
 Income Support (General) (Standard Interest Rate Amendment) (No. 2) Regulations 1997 (S.I. 1997/2055)
 Social Security Administration (Fraud) Act 1997 (Commencement No. 2) Order 1997 (S.I. 1997/2056)
 Local Government (Compensation for Redundancy) (Amendment) Regulations 1997 (S.I. 1997/2059)
 Education (School Performance Information) (England) (Amendment) Regulations 1997 (S.I. 1997/2060)
 Criminal Law (Consolidation) (Scotland) Act 1995 (Detention by Customs Officers) (Specification of Titles) Order 1997 (S.I. 1997/2062)
 Motor Vehicles (Driving Licences) (Amendment) (No. 4) Regulations 1997 (S.I. 1997/2070)
 Animal By-Products (Identification) (Amendment) Regulations 1997 (S.I. 1997/2073)
 Fresh Meat (Hygiene and Inspection) (Amendment) Regulations 1997 (S.I. 1997/2074)
 Road Traffic (Permitted Parking Area and Special Parking Area ) (County of Kent) (Borough of Maidstone) Order 1997 (S.I. 1997/2078)
 Gaming Act (Variation of Monetary Limits) (No. 2) Order 1997 (S.I. 1997/2079)
 Amusements with Prizes (Variation of Monetary Limits) Order 1997 (S.I. 1997/2080)
 Act of Adjournal (Criminal Procedure Rules Amendment No. 6) 1997 (S.I. 1997/2081)
 Act of Adjournal (Criminal Procedure Rules Amendment No. 5) 1997 (S.I. 1997/2082)
 Social Security (Recovery of Benefits) Act 1997 (Commencement) Order 1997 (S.I. 1997/2085)
 Scottish Seed Potato Development Council (Dissolution) Order 1997 (S.I. 1997/2092)
 Local Authorities (Goods and Services) (Public Bodies) (No. 2) Order 1997 (S.I. 1997/2095)

2101-2200
 Northern Ireland Arms Decommissioning Act 1997 (Commencement of Section 7) Order 1997 (S.I. 1997/2111)
 A41 Trunk Road (Camden) (Temporary Prohibition of Traffic) Order 1997 (S.I. 1997/2132)
 A23 Trunk Road (Croydon) Red Route (No. 2) Experimental Traffic Order 1997 (S.I. 1997/2133)
 A23 Trunk Road (Croydon) Red Route (Prohibited Turns) (No. 2) Experimental Traffic Order 1997 (S.I. 1997/2134)
 Wireless Telegraphy (Network User Stations) (Exemption) Regulations 1997 (S.I. 1997/2137)
 Education (Qualifications, Curriculum and Assessment Authority for Wales) (Conferment of Functions) Order 1997 (S.I. 1997/2140)
 Building (Scotland) Amendment Regulations 1997 (S.I. 1997/2157)
 Race Relations (Complaints to Industrial Tribunals) (Armed Forces) Regulations 1997 (S.I. 1997/2161)
 Equal Pay (Complaints to Industrial Tribunals) (Armed Forces) Regulations 1997 (S.I. 1997/2162)
 Sex Discrimination (Complaints to Industrial Tribunals) (Armed Forces) Regulations 1997 (S.I. 1997/2163)
 Armed Forces Act 1996 (Commencement No. 3 and Transitional Provisions) Order 1997 (S.I. 1997/2164)
 Local Government Changes for England (Direct Labour Organisations) (East Riding of Yorkshire District Council) Order 1997 (S.I. 1997/2169)
 County Court (Forms) (Amendment No. 2) Rules 1997 (S.I. 1997/2171)
 Education (Qualifications and Curriculum Authority and Qualifications, Curriculum and Assessment Authority for Wales) (Transfer of Property and Designation of Staff) Order 1997 (S.I. 1997/2172)
 Education (Further Education Institutions Information) (England) (Amendment) Regulations 1997 (S.I. 1997/2173)
 Education (Grants for Education Support and Training) (England) (Amendment) Regulations 1997 (S.I. 1997/2174)
 Education (Grant-Maintained Special Schools) (Amendment) Regulations 1997 (S.I. 1997/2175)
 Education (National Curriculum) (Assessment Arrangements for Key Stages 1, 2 and 3) (England) (Amendment) Order 1997 (S.I. 1997/2176)
 Public Telecommunication System Designation (ACC Long Distance UK Limited) (No. 2) Order 1997 (S.I. 1997/2177)
 Public Telecommunication System Designation (Coventry Cable Limited) Order 1997 (S.I. 1997/2178)
 Public Telecommunication System Designation (Diamond Cable Communications (UK) Limited) Order 1997 (S.I. 1997/2179)
 Public Telecommunication System Designation (Advanced Radio Telecom Limited) Order 1997 (S.I. 1997/2180)
 Public Telecommunication System Designation (RadioTel Systems Limited) Order 1997 (S.I. 1997/2181)
 Foods Intended for Use in Energy Restricted Diets for Weight Reduction Regulations 1997 (S.I. 1997/2182)
 Gaming Duty Regulations 1997 (S.I. 1997/2196)
 Income-related Benefits and Jobseeker's Allowance (Amendment) (No. 2) Regulations 1997 (S.I. 1997/2197)
 Criminal Procedure and Investigations Act 1996 (Appointed Day No. 6) Order 1997 (S.I. 1997/2199)
 Crime (Sentences) Act 1997 (Commencement No. 2 and Transitional Provisions) Order 1997 (S.I. 1997/2200)

2201-2300
 Waste Management Licensing (Amendment) Regulations 1997 (S.I. 1997/2203)
 Registration of Marriages (Amendment) Regulations 1997 (S.I. 1997/2204)
 Food Protection (Emergency Prohibitions) (Oil and Chemical Pollution of Fish and Plants) (Revocation) Order 1997 (S.I. 1997/2206)
 Social Security (Recovery of Benefits) Regulations 1997 (S.I. 1997/2205)
 Immigration (Exemption from Control) (Amendment) (No. 2) Order 1997 (S.I. 1997/2207)
 Northern Ireland Arms Decommissioning Act 1997 (Immunities and Privileges) Order 1997 (S.I. 1997/2231)
 Bicester (Tibbett & Britten Consumer Limited Siding) Order 1997 (S.I. 1997/2232)
 Social Security (Recovery of Benefits) (Appeals) Regulations 1997 (S.I. 1997/2237)
 Food (Pistachios from Iran) (Emergency Control) Order 1997 (S.I. 1997/2238)
 Social Security (Claims and Payments and Adjudication) Amendment Regulations 1997 (S.I. 1997/2239 (This instrument has been revoked and replaced by S.I. 1997/2290))
 Charities (Clergy Orphan Corporation) Order 1997 (S.I. 1997/2240)
 Education (Funding for Teacher Training) Designation (No. 3) Order 1997 (S.I. 1997/2258)
 Local Government Act 1988 (Defined Activities) (Exemption) (Brent London Borough Council and Harrogate Borough Council) Order 1997 (S.I. 1997/2259)
 Road Traffic Act 1991 (Commencement No. 14) (Scotland) Order 1997 (S.I. 1997/2260)
 Local Authorities' Variation of Charges at Off-street and Designated Parking Places (Notice Procedure) (Scotland) Regulations 1997 (S.I. 1997/2261)
 Mid-Norfolk Railway Order 1997 (S.I. 1997/2262)
 Portsmouth Health Care National Health Service Trust (Transfer of Trust Property) (No. 2) Order 1997 (S.I. 1997/2276)
 A127 Trunk Road (Southend Arterial Road, Havering) (50 MPH Speed Limit) Order 1997 (S.I. 1997/2281)
 Motor Cycle (EC Type Approval) (Amendment) Regulations 1997 (S.I. 1997/2282)
 National Crime Squad Service Authority (Levying) Order 1997 (S.I. 1997/2283)
 NCIS Service Authority (Levying) Order 1997 (S.I. 1997/2284)
 A1 Trunk Road (Islington) (Temporary Prohibition of Traffic) Order 1997 (S.I. 1997/2285)
 National Health Service (Proposals for Pilot Schemes) and (Miscellaneous Amendments) Regulations 1997 (S.I. 1997/2289)
 Social Security (Claims and Payments and Adjudication) Amendment No. 2 Regulations 1997 (S.I. 1997/2290)
 Local Government Act 1988 (Defined Activities) (Exemption) (Croydon London Borough Council) Order 1997 (S.I. 1997/2291)
 Local Government Act 1988 (Defined Activities) (Exemption) (Oadby and Wigston Borough Council and Havering London Borough Council) Order 1997 (S.I. 1997/2292)
 Number of Members of Thames Valley Police Authority Order 1997 (S.I. 1997/2293)
 Fireworks (Safety) Regulations 1997 (S.I. 1997/2294)
 Antarctic Act 1994 (Commencement) (No. 2) Order 1997 (S.I. 1997/2298)
 A1 Trunk Road (Barnet) Red Route (Clearway) traf|fi|c Order 1996 Variation Order 1997 (S.I. 1997/2299)
 A1 Trunk Road (Barnet) Red Route Traffic Order 1997 (S.I. 1997/2300)

2301-2400
 A41 Trunk Road (Camden) (Temporary Prohibition of Traffic) (No. 2) Order 1997 (S.I. 1997/2301)
 Building Societies (Designation of Prescribed Regulatory Authorities) Order 1997 (S.I. 1997/2302)
 Road Traffic (Permitted Parking Area and Special Parking Area) (County of Hertfordshire) (Borough of Watford) Order 1997 (S.I. 1997/2304)
 Social Security (Miscellaneous Amendments) (No. 4) Regulations 1997 (S.I. 1997/2305)
 Companies (Membership of Holding Company) (Dealers in Securities) Regulations 1997 (S.I. 1997/2306)
 Children (Protection from Offenders) (Miscellaneous Amendments) Regulations 1997 (S.I. 1997/2308)
 Firemen's Pension Scheme (Amendment) Order 1997 (S.I. 1997/2309)
 Civil Courts (Amendment No. 3) Order 1997 (S.I. 1997/2310)
 Social Fund Cold Weather Payments (General) Amendment Regulations 1997 (S.I. 1997/2311)
 Parole Board (Scotland) Amendment Rules 1997 (S.I. 1997/2317)
 M8 and M9 Special Roads (Newbridge Grade Separation) Speed Limit Regulations 1997 (S.I. 1997/2322)
 Crime and Punishment (Scotland) Act 1997 (Commencement No.2 and Transitional and Consequential Provisions) Order 1997 (S.I. 1997/2323)
 A501 Trunk Road (Camden and Islington) Red Route Traffic Order 1997 (S.I. 1997/2326)
 Housing (Right to Buy) (Priority of Charges) (No. 2) Order 1997 (S.I. 1997/2327)
 Local Government Act 1988 (Defined Activities) (Exemption) (Stockton on Tees Borough Council) Order 1997 (S.I. 1997/2328)
 Procurement of Air Navigation Equipment (Technical Specifications) Regulations 1997 (S.I. 1997/2329)
 Statistical Returns (Carriage of Goods and Passengers by Sea) Regulations 1997 (S.I. 1997/2330)
 Diseases of Animals (Approved Disinfectants) (Amendment) Order 1997 (S.I. 1997/2347)
 Registration of Births, Still-births, Deaths and Marriages (Prescription of Forms) (Scotland) Regulations 1997 (S.I. 1997/2348)
 Marriage (Prescription of Forms) (Scotland) Regulations 1997 (S.I. 1997/2349)
 Curfew Order (Responsible Officer) Order 1997 (S.I. 1997/2351)
 Education Act 1996 (Commencement No. 3) Order 1997 (S.I. 1997/2352)
 Education (Disability Statements for Local Education Authorities) (Wales) Regulations 1997 (S.I. 1997/2353)
 Prevention of Water Pollution (Loch Lomond) (Extension of Period of Byelaws) Order 1997 (S.I. 1997/2354)
 Education (School Performance Information) (England) (Amendment) (No. 2) Regulations 1997 (S.I. 1997/2364)
 Bovine Spongiform Encephalopathy Compensation (Amendment) Order 1997 (S.I. 1997/2365)
 Merchant Shipping (Carriage of Cargoes) (Amendment) Regulations 1997 (S.I. 1997/2366)
 Merchant Shipping (Dangerous Goods and Marine Pollutants) Regulations 1997 (S.I. 1997/2367)
 A4 Trunk Road (Hillingdon) Red Route (Clearway) Traffic Order 1996 Variation Order 1997 (S.I. 1997/2385)
 A406 Trunk Road (Ealing and Hounslow) Red Route Traffic Order 1997 (S.I. 1997/2386)
 Bovine Spongiform Encephalopathy (No. 2) (Amendment) Order 1997 (S.I. 1997/2387)
 Personal Pension Schemes (Establishment of Schemes) Order 1997 (S.I. 1997/2388)
 Airports (Groundhandling) Regulations 1997 (S.I. 1997/2389)
 Police Act 1997 (Commencement No. 4 and Transitional Provisions) Order 1997 (S.I. 1997/2390)
 Police Act 1997 (Provisions in relation to the NCIS Service Authority) (No. 2) Order 1997 (S.I. 1997/2391)
 Finance Act 1997 (Commencement No. 1) Order 1997 (S.I. 1997/2392)
 National Health Service (Travelling Expenses and Remission of Charges) Amendment (No. 2) Regulations 1997 (S.I. 1997/2393)
 Legal Aid in Family Proceedings (Remuneration) (Amendment) Regulations 1997 (S.I. 1997/2394)
 Education (Grants for Education Support and Training) (Wales) (Amendment) Regulations 1997 (S.I. 1997/2395)
 Zebra, Pelican and Puffin Pedestrian Crossings Regulations and General Directions 1997 (S.I. 1997/2400) (This SI has been amended by S.I. 1998/901

2401-2500
 A406 Trunk Road (North Circular Road, Hounslow) Red Route (Prescribed Route) Traffic Order 1997 (S.I. 1997/2401)
 A205 Trunk Road (Hounslow) Red Route (Bus Lanes) Traffic Order 1997 (S.I. 1997/2402)
 A30 Trunk Road (Great South West Road, Hounslow) (Temporary Prohibition of Traffic) Order 1997 (S.I. 1997/2403)
 Police Authorities (Standing Orders) Regulations 1997 (S.I. 1997/2416)
 Social Security Administration (Fraud) Act 1997 (Commencement No. 3) Order 1997 (S.I. 1997/2417)
 Magistrates' Courts (Children and Young Persons) (Amendment) Rules 1997 (S.I. 1997/2420)
 Magistrates' Courts (Forms) (Amendment) (No. 2) Rules 1997 (S.I. 1997/2421)
 Gas Act 1986 (Exemption) Order 1997 (S.I. 1997/2427)
 Finance Act 1997 (Stamp Duty and Stamp Duty Reserve Tax) (Appointed Day) Order 1997 (S.I. 1997/2428)
 Stamp Duty and Stamp Duty Reserve Tax (Investment Exchanges and Clearing Houses) Regulations 1997 (S.I. 1997/2429)
 Stamp Duty Reserve Tax (Amendment) Regulations 1997 (S.I. 1997/2430)
 Housing Benefit and Council Tax Benefit (General) Amendment (No. 2) Regulations 1997 (S.I. 1997/2434)
 Housing Benefit (Recovery of Overpayments) Regulations 1997 (S.I. 1997/2435)
 Housing Benefit (Information from Landlords and Agents) Regulations 1997 (S.I. 1997/2436)
 Value Added Tax (Amendment) (No. 4) Regulations 1997 (S.I. 1997/2437)
 Vehicle Excise Duty (Immobilisation, Removal and Disposal of Vehicles) Regulations 1997 (S.I. 1997/2439)
 Education (Individual Performance Information) (Prescribed Bodies and Persons) Regulations 1997 (S.I. 1997/2440)
 Potatoes Originating in The Netherlands Regulations 1997 (S.I. 1997/2441)
 Prescription as ^q^Persons in Need^/q^ (Persons subject to Immigration Control) (Scotland) Order 1997 (S.I. 1997/2452)
 Oxleas National Health Service Trust (Transfer of Trust Property) Order 1997 (S.I. 1997/2453)
 A205 Trunk Road (Lewisham) Red Route (Bus Lane) (No.2) Experimental Traffic Order 1997 (S.I. 1997/2454)
 National Health Service (Travelling Expenses and Remission of Charges) (Scotland) Amendment (No. 2) Regulations 1997 (S.I. 1997/2455)
 Local Government Changes for England (Direct Labour Organisations) (County of Leicestershire and District of Rutland) Order 1997 (S.I. 1997/2456)
 National Health Service (Primary Care) Act 1997 (Commencement No. 2) Order 1997 (S.I. 1997/2457)
 Local Government Act 1988 (Defined Activities) (Exemption) (Chichester District Council and Mole Valley District Council) Order 1997 (S.I. 1997/2458)
 Export of Goods (United Nations Sanctions) (Sierra Leone) Order 1997 (S.I. 1997/2464)
 North Tyneside Steam Railway Order 1997 (S.I. 1997/2465)
 Railtrack (Ammanford Level Crossings) Order 1997 (S.I. 1997/2466)
 Local Government Pension Scheme (Burnley and Pendle Transport Company Limited) Regulations 1997 (S.I. 1997/2467)
 National Health Service (General Medical Services) Amendment (No. 3) Regulations 1997 (S.I. 1997/2468)
 National Health Service (Fund-Holding Practices Audit) (Scotland) Regulations 1997 (S.I. 1997/2469)
 Surface Waters (Shellfish) (Classification) (Scotland) Regulations 1997 (S.I. 1997/2470)
 Surface Waters (Fishlife) (Classification) (Scotland) Regulations 1997 (S.I. 1997/2471)
 National Health Service (Optical Charges and Payments) Amendment Regulations 1997 (S.I. 1997/2488)
 A1 Trunk Road (Barnet) Red Route (Clearway) Traffic Order 1997 (S.I. 1997/2489)
 Income Tax (Payments on Account) (Amendment) Regulations 1997 This SI has been made because of a defect in SI 1996 No. 1654 S.I. 1997/2491)
 National Health Service (Optical Charges and Payments) (Scotland) Amendment (No.2) Regulations 1997 (S.I. 1997/2492)
 Offshore Installations (Safety Zones) (No. 4) Order 1997 (S.I. 1997/2498)
 Plant Protection Products (Amendment) (No. 2) Regulations 1997 (S.I. 1997/2499)
 Sheep Annual Premium (Amendment) Regulations 1997 (S.I. 1997/2500)

2501-2600
 Licensing (Fees) (Variation) Order 1997 (S.I. 1997/2501)
 Local Government Act 1988 (Defined Activities) (Exemption) (Reigate and Banstead Borough Council, Vale of White Horse District Council and Aylesbury Vale District Council) Order 1997 (S.I. 1997/2502)
 A4 Trunk Road (Great West Road, Hounslow) Red Route (Temporary Prohibition of Traffic) (No.3) Order 1997 (S.I. 1997/2503)
 A4 Trunk Road (Talgarth Road, Hammersmith & Fulham) Red Route (Temporary Prohibition of Traffic) Order 1997 (S.I. 1997/2504)
 Health and Safety (Fees) Regulations 1997 (S.I. 1997/2505)
 Food Protection (Emergency Prohibitions) (Oil and Chemical Pollution of Fish) Order 1997 (S.I. 1997/2509)
 Greater Manchester Ambulance Service National Health Service Trust (Establishment) Amendment Order 1997 (S.I. 1997/2518)
 Act of Sederunt (Judicial Factor Rules) (Amendment No. 2) 1997 (S.I. 1997/2533)
 Caernarfon Railway Light Railway Order 1997 (S.I. 1997/2534)
 A2 Trunk Road (A296 Watling Street Slip Road) (Trunking) Order 1997 (S.I. 1997/2535)
 Protection of Wrecks (Designation No. 4) Order 1997 (S.I. 1997/2536)
 Imported Food Regulations 1997 (S.I. 1997/2537)
 Social Fund Maternity and Funeral Expenses (General) Amendment Regulations 1997 (S.I. 1997/2538)
 Dundee Port Authority (Dissolution) Order 1997 (S.I. 1997/2539)
 Local Government Act 1988 (Defined Activities) (Exemption) (Gloucester City Council and North West Leicestershire District Council) Order 1997 (S.I. 1997/2540)
 Value Added Tax (Payments on Account) (Appeals) Order 1997 (S.I. 1997/2542)
 Financial Services Act 1986 (Extension of Scope of Act) Order 1997 (Approved by Parliament) S.I. 1997/2543)
 Coroners' Records (Fees for Copies) Rules 1997 (S.I. 1997/2544)
 Value Added Tax (Refund of Tax) Order 1997 (S.I. 1997/2558)
 Occupational Pension Schemes (Payments to Employers) Amendment Regulations 1997 (S.I. 1997/2559)
 Surface Waters (Dangerous Substances) (Classification) Regulations 1997 (S.I. 1997/2560)
 Public Telecommunication System Designation (Viatel UK Limited) Order 1997 (S.I. 1997/2561)
 Professions Supplementary to Medicine (Registration Rules) (Amendment) Order of Council 1997 (S.I. 1997/2562)
 European Communities (Designation) (No. 3) Order 1997 (S.I. 1997/2563)
 Education (Inspectors of Schools in England) Order 1997 (S.I. 1997/2564)
 Carriage by Air and Road Act 1979 (Commencement No. 2) Order 1997 (S.I. 1997/2565)
 Merchant Shipping (Liability and Compensation for Oil Pollution Damage) (Transitional Provisions) (Revocation) Order 1997 (S.I. 1997/2566)
 Merchant Shipping (Oil Pollution Preparedness, Response and Cooperation Convention) Order 1997 (S.I. 1997/2567)
 Merchant Shipping (Prevention of Pollution) (Intervention) (Foreign Ships) Order 1997 (S.I. 1997/2568)
 Merchant Shipping (Prevention of Pollution) (Amendment) Order 1997 (S.I. 1997/2569)
 Angola (United Nations Prohibition of Flights) (Dependent Territories) Order 1997 (S.I. 1997/2570)
 Angola (United Nations Prohibition of Flights) Order 1997 (S.I. 1997/2571)
 Angola (United Nations Sanctions) Order 1997 (S.I. 1997/2572)
 Angola (United Nations Sanctions) (Dependent Territories) Order 1997 (S.I. 1997/2573)
 Child Abduction and Custody (Cayman Islands) Order 1997 (S.I. 1997/2574)
 Child Abduction and Custody (Parties to Conventions) (Amendment) (No. 2) Order 1997 (S.I. 1997/2575)
 European Communities (Definition of Treaties) (Framework Cooperation Agreement between the European Community and its Member States and the Republic of Chile) Order 1997 (S.I. 1997/2576)
 European Communities (Definition of Treaties) (Euro-Mediterranean Agreement Establishing an Association between the European Communities and their Member States and the Kingdom of Morocco) Order 1997 (S.I. 1997/2577)
 Merchant Shipping (Liability and Compensation for Oil Pollution Damage) (Transitional Provisions) (Overseas Territories) Order 1997 (S.I. 1997/2578)
 Merchant Shipping (Limitation of Liability for Maritime Claims) (Overseas Territories) Order 1997 (S.I. 1997/2579)
 Merchant Shipping (Oil Pollution) (Anguilla) Order 1997 (S.I. 1997/2580)
 Merchant Shipping (Oil Pollution) (Bermuda) Order 1997 (S.I. 1997/2581)
 Merchant Shipping (Oil Pollution) (British Antarctic Territory) Order 1997 (S.I. 1997/2582)
 Merchant Shipping (Oil Pollution) (British Indian Ocean Territory) Order 1997 (S.I. 1997/2583)
 Merchant Shipping (Oil Pollution) (Falkland Islands) Order 1997 (S.I. 1997/2584)
 Merchant Shipping (Oil Pollution) (Pitcairn) Order 1997 (S.I. 1997/2585)
 Merchant Shipping (Salvage Convention) (Overseas Territories) Order 1997 (S.I. 1997/2586)
 Merchant Shipping (Oil Pollution) (Sovereign Base Areas) Order 1997 (S.I. 1997/2587)
 Merchant Shipping (Oil Pollution) (South Georgia and the South Sandwich Islands) Order 1997 (S.I. 1997/2588)
 Merchant Shipping (Oil Pollution) (Turks and Caicos Islands) Order 1997 (S.I. 1997/2589)
 Merchant Shipping (Oil Pollution) (Virgin Islands) Order 1997 (S.I. 1997/2590)
 State Immunity (Merchant Shipping) Order 1997 (S.I. 1997/2591)
 Sierra Leone (United Nations Sanctions) Order 1997 (S.I. 1997/2592)
 Sierra Leone (United Nations Sanctions) (Dependent Territories) Order 1997 (S.I. 1997/2593)
 Angola (United Nations Sanctions) (Channel Islands) Order 1997 (S.I. 1997/2594)
 Angola (United Nations Sanctions) (Isle of Man) Order 1997 (S.I. 1997/2595)
 European Convention on Extradition Order 1990 (Amendment) (No. 2) Order 1997 (S.I. 1997/2596)
 Health and Personal Social Services (Private Finance) (Northern Ireland) Order 1997 (S.I. 1997/2597)
 Merchant Shipping (Oil Pollution) (Jersey) Order 1997 (S.I. 1997/2598)
 Sierra Leone (United Nations Sanctions) (Channel Islands) Order 1997 (S.I. 1997/2599)
 Sierra Leone (United Nations Sanctions) (Isle of Man) Order 1997 (S.I. 1997/2600)

2601-2700
 Reciprocal Enforcement of Judgments (Administration of Justice Act 1920, Part II) (Amendment) Order 1997 (S.I. 1997/2601)
 Civil Jurisdiction and Judgments Act 1982 (Gibraltar) Order 1997 (S.I. 1997/2602)
 European Communities (Definition of Treaties) (Inter-regional Framework Co-operation Agreement between the European Community and its Member States and the Southern Common Market and its Party States) Order 1997 (S.I. 1997/2603)
 Income Support (General) (Standard Interest Rate Amendment) (No. 3) Regulations 1997 (S.I. 1998/2604)
 Nevill Hall and District National Health Service Trust (Establishment) Amendment Order 1997 (S.I. 1997/2605)
 Local Authorities (Armorial Bearings) (No. 2) Order 1997 (S.I. 1997/2618)
 Housing Benefit (Recovery of Overpayments) (No. 2) Regulations 1997 (S.I. 1997/2619)
 National Health Service (Primary Care) Act 1997 (Commencement No. 3) Order 1997 (S.I. 1997/2620)
 City of Stoke-on-Trent Birches Head Road Canal Footbridge Scheme, 1997 Confirmation Instrument 1997 (S.I. 1997/2621)
 Food Protection (Emergency Prohibitions) (Dounreay Nuclear Establishment) Order 1997 (S.I. 1997/2622)
 Combined Probation Areas (Bedfordshire) Order 1997 (S.I. 1997/2623)
 Education (Pupil Registration) (Amendment) Regulations 1997 (S.I. 1997/2624)
 Scottish Examination Board and Scottish Vocational Education Council (Dissolution) (Scotland) Order 1997 (S.I. 1997/2634)
 Gilt Strips (Consequential Amendments) Regulations 1997 (S.I. 1997/2646)
 Legal Aid in Criminal and Care Proceedings (General) (Amendment) (No. 4) Regulations 1997 (S.I. 1997/2647)
 Local Government Act 1988 (Defined Activities) (Exemptions) (Wales) (Amendment) Order 1997 (S.I. 1997/2648)
 Local Government Act 1988 (Competition) (Wales) (No. 2) Regulations 1997 (S.I. 1997/2649)
 Rhondda Health Care National Health Service Trust (Transfer of Trust Property) Order 1997 (S.I. 1997/2651)
 East Glamorgan National Health Service Trust (Transfer of Trust Property) Order 1997 (S.I. 1997/2652)
 Act of Adjournal (Criminal Procedure Rules Amendment No. 7) 1997 (S.I. 1997/2653)
 A316 Trunk Road (Hounslow) Red Route Experimental Traffic Order 1997 (S.I. 1997/2655)
 A316 Trunk Road (Hounslow and Richmond) Red Route (Clearway) Traffic Order 1997 (S.I. 1997/2656)
 A4 Trunk Road (Hounslow and Hammersmith & Fulham) Red Route (Clearway) Traffic Order 1997 (S.I. 1997/2657)
 Smoke Control Areas (Authorised Fuels) (Amendment) Regulations 1997 (S.I. 1997/2658)
 Air Navigation (Dangerous Goods) (Second Amendment) Regulations 1997 (S.I. 1997/2666)
 Judicial Pensions (Requisite Surviving Spouses' Benefits etc.) Order 1997 (S.I. 1997/2667)
 Building Societies Act 1997 (Commencement No. 3) Order 1997 (S.I. 1997/2668)
 Social Security Administration (Fraud) Act 1997 (Commencement No. 4) Order 1997 (S.I. 1997/2669)
 County Court Fees (Amendment) (No. 2) Order 1997 (S.I. 1997/2670)
 Family Proceedings Fees (Amendment) (No. 4) Order 1997 (S.I. 1997/2671)
 Supreme Court Fees (Amendment) Order 1997 (S.I. 1997/2672)
 Food Industry Development Scheme 1997 (S.I. 1997/2673)
 Food Industry Development Scheme (Specification of Activities) Order 1997 (S.I. 1997/2674)
 Coast Protection (Variation of Excluded Waters) Regulations 1997 (S.I. 1997/2675)
 Social Security (National Insurance Number Information: Exemption) Regulations 1997 (S.I. 1997/2676)
 Jobseeker's Allowance (Amendment) (No. 2) Regulations 1997 (S.I. 1997/2677)
 Teacher Training Agency (Additional Functions) Order 1997 (S.I. 1997/2678)
 Education (Teachers) (Amendment) (No. 2) Regulations 1997 (S.I. 1997/2679)
 Criminal Procedure and Investigations Act 1996 (Defence Disclosure Time Limits) Regulations 1997 (S.I. 1997/2680)
 Lloyd's Underwriters (Scottish Limited Partnerships) (Tax) Regulations 1997 (S.I. 1997/2681)
 A501 Trunk Road (Camden) (Temporary Prohibition of Traffic) Order 1997 (S.I. 1997/2682)
 Portsmouth City Council (M275 Northbound Motorway Slip Road) Scheme 1996 Confirmation Instrument 1997 (S.I. 1997/2683)
 Mersey Regional Ambulance Service National Health Service Trust (Establishment) Amendment Order 1997 (S.I. 1997/2690)
 Oxleas National Health Service Trust (Transfer of Trust Property) Amendment Order 1997 (S.I. 1997/2691)
 Act of Sederunt (Rules of the Court of Session Amendment No.8) (Early Disposal of Reclaiming Motions and Appeals) 1997 (S.I. 1997/2692)
 Building Societies (Prescribed Equitable Interests) Order 1997 (S.I. 1997/2693)
 Crime and Punishment (Scotland) Act 1997 (Commencement No. 3) Order 1997 (S.I. 1997/2694)
 Berkshire Fire Services (Combination Scheme) Order 1997 (S.I. 1997/2695)
 Cambridgeshire Fire Services (Combination Scheme) Order 1997 (S.I. 1997/2696)
 Cheshire Fire Services (Combination Scheme) Order 1997 (S.I. 1997/2697)
 Devon Fire Services (Combination Scheme) Order 1997 (S.I. 1997/2698)
 Essex Fire Services (Combination Scheme) Order 1997 (S.I. 1997/2699)
 Hereford and Worcester Fire Services (Combination Scheme) Order 1997 (S.I. 1997/2700)

2701-2800
 Kent Fire Services (Combination Scheme) Order 1997 (S.I. 1997/2701)
 Shropshire Fire Services (Combination Scheme) Order 1997 (S.I. 1997/2702)
 SECTION 7 OF THE PETROLEUM (PRODUCTION) ACT 1934 AND SECTION 2(1)(a) OF THE PETROLEUM ACT 1987 (MODIFICATION) REGULATIONS 1997 (S.I. 1997/2703)
 Companies Act 1985 (Insurance Companies Accounts) (Minor Amendments) Regulations 1997 (S.I. 1997/2704)
 Income Tax (Paying and Collecting Agents) (Amendment) Regulations 1997 (S.I. 1997/2705)
 Income Tax (Manufactured Overseas Dividends) (Amendment No. 2) Regulations 1997 (S.I. 1997/2706)
 Taxes (Interest Rate) (Amendment No. 2) Regulations 1997 (S.I. 1997/2707)
 Finance Act 1989, section 178(1), (Appointed Day) Order 1997 (S.I. 1997/2708)
 Education (Individual Pupils' Achievements) (Information) (Wales) (Amendment) Regulations 1997 (S.I. 1997/2709)
 Camus an Lighe, Loch Ceann Traigh, Argyll, Oysters and Scallops Several Fishery Order 1997 (S.I. 1997/2711)
 International Fund for Agricultural Development (Fourth Replenishment) Order 1997 (S.I. 1997/2712)
 Asian Development Bank (Sixth Replenishment of the Asian Development Fund) Order 1997 (S.I. 1997/2713)
 Building Societies (Transfer Resolutions) Order 1997 (S.I. 1997/2714)
 Local Government Act 1988 (Competition) (England) (No. 2) Regulations 1997 (S.I. 1997/2732)
 Local Government Act 1988 (Defined Activities) (Housing Management and Security Work) (Exemptions) (England) (Amendment) Order 1997 (S.I. 1997/2733)
 Local Government Changes for England (Housing Management) (Miscellaneous Amendments) Regulations 1997 (S.I. 1997/2734)
 Food Protection (Emergency Prohibitions) (Oil and Chemical Pollution of Fish) Order 1997 (Partial Revocation) Order 1997 (S.I. 1997/2735)
 City of Westminster (A41 Trunk Road) Red Route (Bus Lanes) Traffic Order 1997 (S.I. 1997/2743)
 Value Added Tax (Drugs, Medicines and Aids for the Handicapped) Order 1997 (S.I. 1997/2744)
 Local Government Act 1988 (Defined Activities) (Exemptions) (Amendment) Order 1997 (S.I. 1997/2746)
 Local Government Act 1988 (Competition) (Revocations) Regulations 1997 (S.I. 1997/2747)
 Local Government Act 1988 (Defined Activities) (Exemptions) (Schools) Order 1997 (S.I. 1997/2748)
 A23 Trunk Road (Croydon) Red Route Traffic Order 1997 Variation Order 1997 (S.I. 1997/2749)
 Mink (Keeping) (Amendment) Regulations 1997 (S.I. 1997/2750)
 Coypus (Special Licence) (Fees) Regulations 1997 (S.I. 1997/2751)
 Local Government and Rating Act 1997 (Commencement No. 2) Order 1997 (S.I. 1997/2752)
 Local Government (Direct Labour Organisations) (Competition) (Amendment) Regulations 1997 (S.I. 1997/2756)
 Sole, Plaice, etc. (Specified Sea Areas) (Prohibition of Fishing) Order 1997 (S.I. 1997/2757)
 Export of Goods (Control) (Amendment No. 3) Order 1997 (S.I. 1997/2758)
 Dual-Use and Related Goods (Export Control) (Amendment No. 4) Regulations 1997 (S.I. 1997/2759)
 Lancashire Fire Services (Combination Scheme) Order 1997 (S.I. 1997/2760)
 Nottinghamshire Fire Services (Combination Scheme) Order 1997 (S.I. 1997/2761)
 Civil Courts (Amendment No. 4) Order 1997 (S.I. 1997/2762)
 Public Bodies (Admission to Meetings) (National Health Service Trusts) Order 1997 (S.I. 1997/2763)
 Relocation Grants Regulations 1997 (S.I. 1997/2764)
 M40 Motorway (Wheatley Service Area Access) Connecting Roads Scheme 1997 (S.I. 1997/2765)
 Social Security Administration (Fraud) Act 1997 (Commencement No. 5) Order 1997 (S.I. 1997/2766)
 South Yorkshire Metropolitan Ambulance and Paramedic Service National Health Service Trust (Establishment) Amendment Order 1997 (S.I. 1997/2767)
 Public Telecommunication System Designation (Atlantic Telecommunications Limited) Order 1997 (S.I. 1997/2768)
 Public Telecommunication System Designation (WORLDxCHANGE Communications Limited) Order 1997 (S.I. 1997/2769)
 Public Telecommunications System Designation (First Telecom plc) Order 1997 (S.I. 1997/2770)
 Public Telecommunication System Designation (American Telemedia Limited) Order 1997 (S.I. 1997/2771)
 Public Telecommunication System Designation (TotalTel International Inc.) Order 1997 (S.I. 1997/2772)
 Education (Assisted Places) (Scotland) Amendment (No.2) Regulations 1997 (S.I. 1997/2773)
 Education (Schools) Act 1997 (Commencement) Order 1997 (S.I. 1997/2774)
 Diving at Work Regulations 1997 (S.I. 1997/2776)
 Industrial Pollution Control (Northern Ireland) Order 1997 (S.I. 1997/2777)
 Waste and Contaminated Land (Northern Ireland) Order 1997 (S.I. 1997/2778)
 Shops (Sunday Trading &c.) (Northern Ireland) Order 1997 (S.I. 1997/2779)
 Civil Jurisdiction and Judgments Act 1982 (Provisional and Protective Measures) (Scotland) Order 1997 (S.I. 1997/2780)
 Transfer of Functions (Insurance) Order 1997 (S.I. 1997/2781)
 A1 Trunk Road (Islington High Street) Red Route (Prohibited Turn) Traffic Order 1997 (S.I. 1997/2782)
 A1 Trunk Road (Islington) Red Route Traffic Order 1993 Variation Order 1997 (S.I. 1997/2783)
 London Borough of Islington (Trunk Roads) Red Route (Bus Lanes) Experimental Traffic Order 1997 (S.I. 1997/2784)
 A4 Trunk Road (Hammersmith & Fulham and Kensington & Chelsea) Red Route Experimental Traffic Order 1997 (S.I. 1997/2785)
 A41 Trunk Road (Camden) (Temporary Prohibition of Traffic) (No. 3) Order 1997 (S.I. 1997/2786)
 National Health Service (Vocational Training) Amendment Regulations 1997 (S.I. 1997/2787)
 Staffordshire Ambulance Service National Health Service Trust (Establishment) Amendment Order 1997 (S.I. 1997/2788)
 Horse Passports Order 1997 (S.I. 1997/2789)
 Grants for School Improvements (Scotland) Regulations 1997 (S.I. 1997/2790)
 Police Cadets (Scotland) Amendment Regulations 1997 (S.I. 1997/2791)
 Non-Domestic Rating (Rural Settlements) (England) Order 1997 (S.I. 1997/2792)
 Income-related Benefits (Miscellaneous Amendments) Regulations 1997 (S.I. 1997/2793)

2801-2900
 Social Security (Penalty Notice) Regulations 1997 (S.I. 1997/2813)
 Social Security (National Insurance Number Information: Exemption) (No. 2) Regulations 1997 (S.I. 1997/2814)
 Occupational Pensions (Revaluation) Order 1997 (S.I. 1997/2815)
 Education (School Performance Information) (England) (Amendment) (No. 3) Regulations 1997 (S.I. 1997/2816)
 National Health Service (Vocational Training for General Medical Practice) Regulations 1997 (S.I. 1997/2817)
 Combined Fire Authorities (Protection from Personal Liability) (Wales) Order 1997 (S.I. 1997/2818)
 Combined Fire Authorities (Protection from Personal Liability) (England) Regulations 1997 (S.I. 1997/2819)
 A205 Trunk Road (Perry Vale and Waldram Crescent, Lewisham) Red Route (Prohibited Turns) Traffic Order 1997 (S.I. 1997/2820)
 Public Telecommunication System Designation (Cable Thames Valley Limited) Order 1997 (S.I. 1997/2821)
 Public Telecommunication System Designation (General Telecommunications Limited) Order 1997 (S.I. 1997/2822)
 Public Telecommunication System Designation (Eurobell (Holdings) PLC) Order 1997 (S.I. 1997/2823)
 Act of Sederunt (Fees of Sheriff Officers) 1997 (S.I. 1997/2824)
 Act of Sederunt (Fees of Messengers-at-Arms) 1997 (S.I. 1997/2825)
 Local Government and Rating Act 1997 (Commencement No.3) Order 1997 (S.I. 1997/2826)
 Non-Domestic Rating (Rural Areas and Rateable Value Limits) (Scotland) Order 1997 (S.I. 1997/2827)
 Building Societies (Members' Resolutions) Order 1997 (S.I. 1997/2840)
 Sea Fishing (Enforcement of Community Conservation Measures) (Amendment) Order 1997 (S.I. 1997/2841)
 Local Government Changes for England (Property Transfer) (Humberside) Order 1997 (S.I. 1997/2842)
 Local Government (Contracts) Act 1997 (Commencement No. 1) Order 1997 (S.I. 1997/2843)
 Sheep Annual Premium and Suckler Cow Premium Quotas Regulations 1997 (S.I. 1997/2844)
 Housing Grants, Construction and Regeneration Act 1996 (Commencement No. 3) Order 1997 (S.I. 1997/2846)
 Relocation Grants (Form of Application) Regulations 1997 (S.I. 1997/2847)
 A1 Trunk Road (Haringey) (Temporary Prohibition of Traffic) Order 1997 (S.I. 1997/2848)
 Friendly Societies (Amendment) Regulations 1997 (S.I. 1997/2849)
 A10 Trunk Road (Haringey) (Temporary Prohibition of Traffic) Order 1997 (S.I. 1997/2850)
 Firemen's Pension Scheme (Amendment No. 2) Order 1997 (S.I. 1997/2851)
 Police Pensions (Amendment) (No. 2) Regulations 1997 (S.I. 1997/2852)
 Local Authorities (Contracts) Regulations 1997 (S.I. 1997/2862)
 Social Security Amendment (New Deal) Regulations 1997 (S.I. 1997/2863)
 Statistics of Trade (Customs and Excise) (Amendment) Regulations 1997 (S.I. 1997/2864)
 Insurance Companies (Pension Business) (Transitional Provisions) (Amendment) Regulations 1997 (S.I. 1997/2865)
 Wheeled Child Conveyances (Safety) Regulations 1997 (S.I. 1997/2866)
 Non-Domestic Rating Contributions (Scotland) Amendment Regulations 1997 (S.I. 1997/2867)
 Environmentally Sensitive Areas (Preseli) Designation (Amendment No. 2) Order 1997 (S.I. 1997/2868)
 Building Societies (Prescribed Form of Receipt) Rules 1997 (S.I. 1997/2869)
 Treasury Solicitor (Crown's Nominee) Rules 1997 (S.I. 1997/2870)
 Medicines (Pharmacies) (Applications for Registration and Fees) Amendment Regulations 1997 (S.I. 1997/2876)
 Friendly Societies (Modification of the Corporation Tax Acts) (Amendment No. 2) Regulations 1997 (S.I. 1997/2877)
 Local Government (Contracts) Act 1997 (Commencement No.2) Order 1997 (S.I. 1997/2878)
 Local Authorities (Contracts) (Scotland) Regulations 1997 (S.I. 1997/2879)
 Local Government Property Commission (Scotland) (Winding Up) Order 1997 (S.I. 1997/2880)
 Medicines (Restrictions on the Administration of Veterinary Medicinal Products) Amendment Regulations 1997 (S.I. 1997/2884)
 Non-Domestic Rating (Rural Settlements) (Wales) Order 1997 (S.I. 1997/2885)
 Merchant Shipping (Master's Discretion) Regulations 1997 (S.I. 1997/2886)
 Value Added Tax (Amendment) (No. 5) Regulations 1997 (S.I. 1997/2887)
 Local Government Act 1988 (Defined Activities) (Exemption) (Easington District Council, Epping Forest District Council and London Borough of Merton) Order 1997 (S.I. 1997/2888)
 Local Government Act 1988 (Defined Activities) (Exemption) (Stevenage Borough Council and Three Rivers District Council) Order 1997 (S.I. 1997/2889)
 Sole, Plaice, etc. (Specified Sea Areas) (Prohibition of Fishing) (No. 2) Order 1997 (S.I. 1997/2891)
 Medicines (Veterinary Drugs) (Pharmacy and Merchants' List) (Amendment) Order 1997 (S.I. 1997/2892)
 Charges for Inspections and Controls Regulations 1997 (S.I. 1997/2893)
 Animal By-Products (Amendment) Order 1997 (S.I. 1997/2894)

2901-3000
 Transport and Works (Descriptions of Works Interfering with Navigation) (Amendment) Order 1997 (S.I. 1997/2906)
 Plant Health (Great Britain) (Amendment) (No. 2) Order 1997 (S.I. 1997/2907)
 Local Government Act 1988 (Defined Activities) (Exemption) (Bath and North East Somerset District Council) Order 1997 (S.I. 1997/2908)
 Public Telecommunication System Designation (Sussex Cable & Telecoms Limited) Order 1997 (S.I. 1997/2909)
 Public Telecommunication System Designation (Shropshire Cable & Telecoms Limited) Order 1997 (S.I. 1997/2910)
 Insurance Companies (Accounts and Statements) (Amendment) Regulations 1997 (S.I. 1997/2911)
 Civil Aviation (Air Travel Organisers' Licensing) (Second Amendment) Regulations 1997 (S.I. 1997/2912)
 Courses for Drink-Drive Offenders (Designation of Areas) Order 1997 (S.I. 1997/2913)
 Cosmetic Products (Safety) (Amendment) Regulations 1997 (S.I. 1997/2914)
 Motor Vehicles (Driving Licences) (Amendment) (No. 5) Regulations 1997 (S.I. 1997/2915)
 Minibus and Other Section 19 Permit Buses (Amendment) Regulations 1997 (S.I. 1997/2916)
 Community Bus (Amendment) Regulations 1997 (S.I. 1997/2917)
 Education (Particulars of Independent Schools) Regulations 1997 (S.I. 1997/2918)
 Education (Student Loans) (Amendment) Regulations 1997 (S.I. 1997/2919)
 Civil Aviation (Route Charges for Navigation Services) Regulations 1997 (S.I. 1997/2920)
 A205 Trunk Road (Southwark) Red Route (Bus Lanes) Experimental Traffic Order 1997 (S.I. 1997/2921)
 A23 Trunk Road (Lambeth) Red Route Experimental Traffic Order 1997 (S.I. 1997/2922)
 European Specialist Medical Qualifications Amendment Regulations 1997 (S.I. 1997/2928)
 National Health Service (Pilot Schemes — Health Service Bodies) Regulations 1997 (S.I. 1997/2929)
 Telecommunications (Licensing) Regulations 1997 (S.I. 1997/2930)
 Telecommunications (Interconnection) Regulations 1997 (S.I. 1997/2931)
 Telecommunications (Open Network Provision and Leased Lines) Regulations 1997 (S.I. 1997/2932)
 Motor Vehicles (Type Approval) (Great Britain) (Amendment) (No. 3) Regulations 1997 (S.I. 1997/2933)
 Motor Vehicles (Approval) (Amendment) (No. 2) Regulations 1997 (S.I. 1997/2934)
 Road Vehicles (Construction and Use) (Amendment) (No. 6) Regulations 1997 (S.I. 1997/2935)
 Motor Vehicles (Type Approval for Goods Vehicles) (Great Britain) (Amendment) (No. 2) Regulations 1997 (S.I. 1997/2936)
 Civil Aviation (Joint Financing) Regulations 1997 (S.I. 1997/2937)
 Southend Health Care Services National Health Service Trust (Change of Name) Order 1997 (S.I. 1997/2938)
 Registration of Births, Deaths and Marriages (Fees) Order 1997 (S.I. 1997/2939)
 Disqualification from Driving (Prescribed Courts) (Scotland) Order 1997 (S.I. 1997/2940)
 Invergarry-Kyle of Lochalsh Trunk Road (A87) Extension (Skye Bridge Crossing) Toll Order (Variation) Order 1997 (S.I. 1997/2941)
 Removal of Vehicles (Prescribed Charges) (Scotland) Regulations 1997 (S.I. 1997/2942)
 Child Support (Written Agreements) (Scotland) Order 1997 (S.I. 1997/2943)
 Restrictive Trade Practices (Non-notifiable Agreements) (Turnover Threshold) Amendment Order 1997 (S.I. 1997/2944)
 Restrictive Trade Practices (Non-notifiable Agreements) (Sale and Purchase, Share Subscription and Franchise Agreements) Order 1997 (S.I. 1997/2945)
 London Docklands Development Corporation (Planning Functions) Order 1997 (S.I. 1997/2946)
 Severn Bridges Tolls Order 1997 (S.I. 1997/2947)
 Dundee Teaching Hospitals National Health Service Trust (Establishment) Amendment Order 1997 (S.I. 1997/2948)
 Portland Harbour Revision Order 1997 (S.I. 1997/2949)
 A102(M) Motorway (Port Greenwich Development Connecting Roads) Scheme 1997 (S.I. 1997/2950)
 A102 Trunk Road (Port Greenwich Development Slip Roads) Order 1997 (S.I. 1997/2951)
 Local Government Changes for England (Valuation Tribunals) Regulations 1997 (S.I. 1997/2954)
 Beef Bones Regulations 1997 (S.I. 1997/2959)
 Highway Litter Clearance and Cleaning (Transfer of Responsibility) Order 1997 (S.I. 1997/2960)
 Education (Grant) (Amendment) (No. 2) Regulations 1997 (S.I. 1997/2961)
 Merchant Shipping and Fishing Vessels (Health and Safety at Work) Regulations 1997 (S.I. 1997/2962)
 Mackerel (Specified Sea Areas) (Prohibition of Fishing) Order 1997 (S.I. 1997/2963)
 Specified Risk Material Order 1997 (S.I. 1997/2964)
 Specified Risk Material Regulations 1997 (S.I. 1997/2965)
 Antarctic (Guernsey) Regulations 1997 (S.I. 1997/2966)
 Antarctic (Jersey) Regulations 1997 (S.I. 1997/2967)
 Antarctic (Isle of Man) Regulations 1997 (S.I. 1997/2968)
 Arable Area Payments (Amendment) Regulations 1997 (S.I. 1997/2969)
 Secretary of State for the Environment, Transport and the Regions Order 1997 (S.I. 1997/2971)
 European Communities (Definition of Treaties) (European Police Office) Order 1997 (S.I. 1997/2972)
 European Communities (Immunities and Privileges of the European Police Office) Order 1997 (S.I. 1997/2973)
 Falkland Islands Constitution (Amendment) (No. 2) Order 1997 (S.I. 1997/2974)
 OSPAR Commission (Immunities and Privileges) Order 1997 (S.I. 1997/2975)
 Criminal Justice Act 1988 (Designated Countries and Territories) (Amendment) (No. 2) Order 1997 (S.I. 1997/2976)
 Criminal Justice (International Co-operation) Act 1990 (Enforcement of Overseas Forfeiture Orders) (Amendment) (No. 2) Order 1997 (S.I. 1997/2977)
 Deep Sea Mining (Temporary Provisions) Act 1981 (Guernsey) Order 1997 (S.I. 1997/2978)
 Deep Sea Mining (Temporary Provisions) Act 1981 (Jersey) Order 1997 (S.I. 1997/2979)
 Drug Trafficking Act 1994 (Designated Countries and Territories) (Amendment) (No. 2) Order 1997 (S.I. 1997/2980)
 Immigration (European Economic Area) (Amendment) Order 1997 (S.I. 1997/2981)
 Summer Time Order 1997 (S.I. 1997/2982)
 Civil Evidence (Northern Ireland) Order 1997 (S.I. 1997/2983)
 Deregulation (Northern Ireland) Order 1997 (S.I. 1997/2984)
 Double Taxation Relief (Taxes on Income) (Falkland Islands) Order 1997 (S.I. 1997/2985)
 Double Taxation Relief (Taxes on Income) (Lesotho) Order 1997 (S.I. 1997/2986)
 Double Taxation Relief (Taxes on Income) (Malaysia) Order 1997 (S.I. 1997/2987)
 Double Taxation Relief (Taxes on Income) (Singapore) Order 1997 (S.I. 1997/2988)
 Aviation Security (Guernsey) Order 1997 (S.I. 1997/2989)
 National Health Service Trusts (Membership and Procedure) Amendment Regulations 1997 (S.I. 1997/2990)
 National Health Service Trusts (Membership and Procedure) Amendment Regulations 1997 (S.I. 1997/2991)

3001-3100
 Teachers' Pensions Regulations 1997 (S.I. 1997/3001)
 Mink Keeping Order 1997 (S.I. 1997/3002)
 Non-Domestic Rating Contributions (Wales) (Amendment) Regulations 1997 (S.I. 1997/3003)
 Crime and Punishment (Scotland) Act 1997 (Commencement No. 4) Order 1997 (S.I. 1997/3004)
 Long Residential Tenancies (Supplemental Forms) Regulations 1997 (S.I. 1997/3005)
 Town and Country Planning General (Amendment) Regulations 1997 (S.I. 1997/3006)
 Rent Assessment Committees (England and Wales) (Amendment) Regulations 1997 (S.I. 1997/3007)
 Long Residential Tenancies (Principal Forms) Regulations 1997 (S.I. 1997/3008)
 Smoke Control Areas (Exempted Fireplaces) Order 1997 (S.I. 1997/3009)
 General Lighthouse Authorities (Beacons: Maritime Differential Correction Systems) Order 1997 (S.I. 1997/3016)
 Non-Domestic Rating (Chargeable Amounts) (Amendment) (No. 2) Regulations 1997 (S.I. 1997/3017)
 Merchant Shipping (Port Waste Reception Facilities) Regulations 1997 (S.I. 1997/3018)
 Channel 4 (Application of Excess Revenues) Order 1997 (S.I. 1997/3019)
 Potato Marketing Scheme (Certification of Revocation) Order 1997 (S.I. 1997/3020)
 National Health Service (Pilot Schemes: Financial Assistance for Preparatory Work) Amendment Regulations 1997 (S.I. 1997/3021)
 Merchant Shipping (ISM Code) (Ro-Ro Passenger Ferries) Regulations 1997 (S.I. 1997/3022)
 Products of Animal Origin (Import and Export) (Amendment) Regulations 1997 (S.I. 1997/3023)
 Financial Services Act 1986 (Miscellaneous Exemptions) Order 1997 (S.I. 1997/3024)
 Road Vehicles (Statutory Off-Road Notification) Regulations 1997 (S.I. 1997/3025)
 Non-Domestic Rating Contributions (England) (Amendment) Regulations 1997 (S.I. 1997/3031)
 Copyright and Rights in Databases Regulations 1997 (S.I. 1997/3032)
 Export of Goods (United Nations Sanctions) (Sierra Leone) (Amendment) Order 1997 (S.I. 1997/3033)
 Social Security (Claims and Payments) Amendment Regulations 1997 (S.I. 1997/3034)
 Non-automatic Weighing Instruments (EEC Requirements) (Amendment) Regulations 1997 (S.I. 1997/3035)
 Land Registration Act 1997 (Commencement) Order 1997 (S.I. 1997/3036)
 Land Registration Rules 1997 (S.I. 1997/3037)
 Personal and Occupational Pension Schemes (Miscellaneous Amendments) (No. 2) Regulations 1997 (S.I. 1997/3038)
 A41 Trunk Road (Camden) (Temporary Prohibition of Traffic) (No. 4) Order 1997 (S.I. 1997/3042)
 Air Quality Regulations 1997 (S.I. 1997/3043)
 Environment Act 1995 (Commencement No. 10) Order 1997 (S.I. 1997/3044)
 A205 Trunk Road (Southwark) Red Route Experimental Traffic Order 1997 (S.I. 1997/3045)
 Food (Pistachios from Iran) (Emergency Control) (Amendment) Order 1997 (S.I. 1997/3046)
 Criminal Procedure and Investigations Act 1996 (Code of Practice) (Northern Ireland) Order 1997 (S.I. 1997/3047)
 Local Government Superannuation (Scotland) Amendment (No.4) Regulations 1997 (S.I. 1997/3048)
 Homeless Persons (Priority Need) (Scotland) Order 1997 (S.I. 1997/3049)
 Wireless Telegraphy Apparatus Approval and Examination Fees Order 1997 (S.I. 1997/3050)
 Electromagnetic Compatibility (Wireless Telegraphy Apparatus) Certification and Examination Fees Regulations 1997 (S.I. 1997/3051)
 Combined Probation Areas (North Wales) Order 1997 (S.I. 1997/3052)
 Traffic Signs (Temporary Obstructions) Regulations 1997 (S.I. 1997/3053)
 Sole, etc. (Specified Sea Areas) (Prohibition of Fishing) Order 1997 (S.I. 1997/3054)
 Conservation (Natural Habitats, &c.) (Amendment) Regulations 1997 (S.I. 1997/3055)
 Road Traffic (Special Parking Area) (London Borough of Bromley) (Amendment) Order 1997 (S.I. 1997/3056)
 Road Traffic (Special Parking Area) (London Borough of Haringey) (Amendment) Order 1997 (S.I. 1997/3057)
 Road Traffic (Vehicle Emissions) (Fixed Penalty) Regulations 1997 (S.I. 1997/3058)
 Act of Sederunt (Rules of the Court of Session Amendment No. 9) (Solicitors and Notaries Public) 1997 (S.I. 1997/3059)
 Town and Country Planning (General Permitted Development) (Scotland) Amendment (No.2) Order 1997 (S.I. 1997/3060)
 Town and Country Planning (Use Classes) (Scotland) Order 1997 (S.I. 1997/3061)
 Specified Risk Material (Amendment) Regulations 1997 (S.I. 1997/3062)
 Vehicle Excise Duty (Immobilisation, Removal and Disposal of Vehicles) (Amendment) Regulations 1997 (S.I. 1997/3063)
 A205 Trunk Road (Lewisham) Red Route Experimental Traffic Order 1997 Variation Order 1997 (S.I. 1997/3066)
 Local Government (Changes for the Registration Service in Berkshire, Cambridgeshire, Cheshire, Devon, Essex, Hereford and Worcester, Kent, Lancashire, Nottinghamshire and Shropshire) Order 1997 (S.I. 1997/3067)
 Antarctic Act 1994 (Commencement) (No. 3) Order 1997 (S.I. 1997/3068)
 Criminal Legal Aid (Scotland) (Prescribed Proceedings) Regulations 1997 (S.I. 1997/3069)
 Advice and Assistance (Assistance by Way of Representation) (Scotland) Regulations 1997 (S.I. 1997/3070)

3101-3200
 Merchant Shipping Act 1995 (Appointed Day No. 2) Order 1997 (S.I. 1997/3107)
 Criminal Procedure and Investigations Act 1996 (Appointed Day No. 7) Order 1997 (S.I. 1997/3108)
 Firearms (Amendment) (No. 2) Act 1997 (Commencement) Order 1997 (S.I. 1997/3114)

External links
Legislation.gov.uk delivered by the UK National Archive
UK SI's on legislation.gov.uk
UK Draft SI's on legislation.gov.uk

See also
List of Statutory Instruments of the United Kingdom

Lists of Statutory Instruments of the United Kingdom
Statutory Instruments